

438001–438100 

|-bgcolor=#E9E9E9
| 438001 ||  || — || October 21, 2003 || Palomar || NEAT || — || align=right data-sort-value="0.64" | 640 m || 
|-id=002 bgcolor=#E9E9E9
| 438002 ||  || — || October 18, 2003 || Kitt Peak || Spacewatch || — || align=right | 2.3 km || 
|-id=003 bgcolor=#E9E9E9
| 438003 ||  || — || October 17, 2003 || Apache Point || SDSS || — || align=right | 1.0 km || 
|-id=004 bgcolor=#fefefe
| 438004 ||  || — || October 22, 2003 || Apache Point || SDSS || — || align=right data-sort-value="0.61" | 610 m || 
|-id=005 bgcolor=#E9E9E9
| 438005 ||  || — || November 16, 2003 || Catalina || CSS || — || align=right data-sort-value="0.91" | 910 m || 
|-id=006 bgcolor=#E9E9E9
| 438006 ||  || — || November 16, 2003 || Catalina || CSS || — || align=right | 2.6 km || 
|-id=007 bgcolor=#E9E9E9
| 438007 ||  || — || November 18, 2003 || Palomar || NEAT || — || align=right | 1.6 km || 
|-id=008 bgcolor=#FA8072
| 438008 ||  || — || November 3, 2003 || Socorro || LINEAR || — || align=right | 1.8 km || 
|-id=009 bgcolor=#E9E9E9
| 438009 ||  || — || November 18, 2003 || Kitt Peak || Spacewatch || — || align=right | 1.1 km || 
|-id=010 bgcolor=#FA8072
| 438010 ||  || — || November 21, 2003 || Socorro || LINEAR || — || align=right | 1.5 km || 
|-id=011 bgcolor=#E9E9E9
| 438011 ||  || — || November 19, 2003 || Kitt Peak || Spacewatch || — || align=right | 2.8 km || 
|-id=012 bgcolor=#E9E9E9
| 438012 ||  || — || November 19, 2003 || Socorro || LINEAR || — || align=right | 1.6 km || 
|-id=013 bgcolor=#E9E9E9
| 438013 ||  || — || November 19, 2003 || Kitt Peak || Spacewatch || — || align=right | 2.9 km || 
|-id=014 bgcolor=#E9E9E9
| 438014 ||  || — || December 14, 2003 || Kitt Peak || Spacewatch || — || align=right | 2.4 km || 
|-id=015 bgcolor=#E9E9E9
| 438015 ||  || — || November 21, 2003 || Kitt Peak || Spacewatch || ADE || align=right | 1.8 km || 
|-id=016 bgcolor=#FA8072
| 438016 ||  || — || December 22, 1998 || Kitt Peak || Spacewatch || H || align=right data-sort-value="0.70" | 700 m || 
|-id=017 bgcolor=#FFC2E0
| 438017 ||  || — || December 18, 2003 || Socorro || LINEAR || APO || align=right data-sort-value="0.68" | 680 m || 
|-id=018 bgcolor=#FA8072
| 438018 ||  || — || December 20, 2003 || Socorro || LINEAR || — || align=right | 3.3 km || 
|-id=019 bgcolor=#E9E9E9
| 438019 ||  || — || December 18, 2003 || Palomar || NEAT || — || align=right | 2.0 km || 
|-id=020 bgcolor=#E9E9E9
| 438020 ||  || — || December 18, 2003 || Socorro || LINEAR || EUN || align=right | 1.3 km || 
|-id=021 bgcolor=#fefefe
| 438021 ||  || — || December 27, 2003 || Socorro || LINEAR || — || align=right | 1.4 km || 
|-id=022 bgcolor=#E9E9E9
| 438022 ||  || — || January 17, 2004 || Kitt Peak || Spacewatch || — || align=right | 2.3 km || 
|-id=023 bgcolor=#fefefe
| 438023 ||  || — || January 19, 2004 || Kitt Peak || Spacewatch || V || align=right data-sort-value="0.59" | 590 m || 
|-id=024 bgcolor=#E9E9E9
| 438024 ||  || — || February 11, 2004 || Catalina || CSS || JUN || align=right | 1.0 km || 
|-id=025 bgcolor=#fefefe
| 438025 ||  || — || January 31, 2004 || Socorro || LINEAR || — || align=right | 1.2 km || 
|-id=026 bgcolor=#fefefe
| 438026 ||  || — || February 16, 2004 || Kitt Peak || Spacewatch || — || align=right data-sort-value="0.87" | 870 m || 
|-id=027 bgcolor=#fefefe
| 438027 ||  || — || February 23, 2004 || Socorro || LINEAR || — || align=right data-sort-value="0.78" | 780 m || 
|-id=028 bgcolor=#C2E0FF
| 438028 ||  || — || March 15, 2004 || Kitt Peak || M. W. Buie || plutino || align=right | 117 km || 
|-id=029 bgcolor=#d6d6d6
| 438029 ||  || — || March 27, 2004 || Socorro || LINEAR || — || align=right | 2.2 km || 
|-id=030 bgcolor=#fefefe
| 438030 ||  || — || March 26, 2004 || Socorro || LINEAR || — || align=right data-sort-value="0.74" | 740 m || 
|-id=031 bgcolor=#fefefe
| 438031 ||  || — || March 18, 2004 || Socorro || LINEAR || — || align=right data-sort-value="0.78" | 780 m || 
|-id=032 bgcolor=#fefefe
| 438032 ||  || — || April 12, 2004 || Kitt Peak || Spacewatch || — || align=right data-sort-value="0.65" | 650 m || 
|-id=033 bgcolor=#d6d6d6
| 438033 ||  || — || April 12, 2004 || Kitt Peak || Spacewatch || — || align=right | 2.0 km || 
|-id=034 bgcolor=#d6d6d6
| 438034 ||  || — || April 12, 2004 || Anderson Mesa || LONEOS || — || align=right | 2.4 km || 
|-id=035 bgcolor=#FA8072
| 438035 ||  || — || April 16, 2004 || Kitt Peak || Spacewatch || — || align=right | 2.0 km || 
|-id=036 bgcolor=#d6d6d6
| 438036 ||  || — || April 16, 2004 || Kitt Peak || Spacewatch || — || align=right | 2.3 km || 
|-id=037 bgcolor=#d6d6d6
| 438037 ||  || — || April 21, 2004 || Kitt Peak || Spacewatch || — || align=right | 3.0 km || 
|-id=038 bgcolor=#fefefe
| 438038 ||  || — || April 12, 2004 || Kitt Peak || Spacewatch || — || align=right data-sort-value="0.78" | 780 m || 
|-id=039 bgcolor=#fefefe
| 438039 ||  || — || May 10, 2004 || Kitt Peak || Spacewatch || — || align=right data-sort-value="0.62" | 620 m || 
|-id=040 bgcolor=#FA8072
| 438040 ||  || — || May 13, 2004 || Socorro || LINEAR || H || align=right data-sort-value="0.71" | 710 m || 
|-id=041 bgcolor=#fefefe
| 438041 ||  || — || May 16, 2004 || Kitt Peak || Spacewatch || — || align=right data-sort-value="0.95" | 950 m || 
|-id=042 bgcolor=#fefefe
| 438042 ||  || — || May 19, 2004 || Needville || Needville Obs. || — || align=right data-sort-value="0.68" | 680 m || 
|-id=043 bgcolor=#fefefe
| 438043 ||  || — || June 13, 2004 || Kitt Peak || Spacewatch || H || align=right data-sort-value="0.64" | 640 m || 
|-id=044 bgcolor=#fefefe
| 438044 ||  || — || July 7, 2004 || Campo Imperatore || CINEOS || — || align=right data-sort-value="0.76" | 760 m || 
|-id=045 bgcolor=#fefefe
| 438045 ||  || — || July 11, 2004 || Socorro || LINEAR || H || align=right | 1.0 km || 
|-id=046 bgcolor=#d6d6d6
| 438046 ||  || — || July 11, 2004 || Anderson Mesa || LONEOS || Tj (2.99) || align=right | 4.8 km || 
|-id=047 bgcolor=#d6d6d6
| 438047 ||  || — || July 21, 2004 || Reedy Creek || J. Broughton || Tj (2.98) || align=right | 4.4 km || 
|-id=048 bgcolor=#d6d6d6
| 438048 ||  || — || July 22, 2004 || Mauna Kea || C. Veillet || — || align=right | 4.8 km || 
|-id=049 bgcolor=#fefefe
| 438049 ||  || — || August 9, 2004 || Campo Imperatore || CINEOS || — || align=right data-sort-value="0.82" | 820 m || 
|-id=050 bgcolor=#fefefe
| 438050 ||  || — || August 9, 2004 || Socorro || LINEAR || critical || align=right data-sort-value="0.75" | 750 m || 
|-id=051 bgcolor=#fefefe
| 438051 ||  || — || August 8, 2004 || Socorro || LINEAR || NYS || align=right data-sort-value="0.66" | 660 m || 
|-id=052 bgcolor=#fefefe
| 438052 ||  || — || August 8, 2004 || Anderson Mesa || LONEOS || NYS || align=right data-sort-value="0.74" | 740 m || 
|-id=053 bgcolor=#fefefe
| 438053 ||  || — || August 10, 2004 || Anderson Mesa || LONEOS || — || align=right | 1.0 km || 
|-id=054 bgcolor=#FA8072
| 438054 ||  || — || August 11, 2004 || Palomar || NEAT || — || align=right | 1.0 km || 
|-id=055 bgcolor=#d6d6d6
| 438055 ||  || — || August 15, 2004 || Campo Imperatore || CINEOS || — || align=right | 2.4 km || 
|-id=056 bgcolor=#fefefe
| 438056 ||  || — || August 22, 2004 || Kitt Peak || Spacewatch || V || align=right data-sort-value="0.73" | 730 m || 
|-id=057 bgcolor=#d6d6d6
| 438057 ||  || — || June 21, 2004 || Socorro || LINEAR || — || align=right | 4.2 km || 
|-id=058 bgcolor=#d6d6d6
| 438058 ||  || — || September 7, 2004 || Socorro || LINEAR || — || align=right | 2.8 km || 
|-id=059 bgcolor=#fefefe
| 438059 ||  || — || September 6, 2004 || Palomar || NEAT || — || align=right data-sort-value="0.78" | 780 m || 
|-id=060 bgcolor=#fefefe
| 438060 ||  || — || September 7, 2004 || Socorro || LINEAR || — || align=right data-sort-value="0.99" | 990 m || 
|-id=061 bgcolor=#fefefe
| 438061 ||  || — || September 7, 2004 || Socorro || LINEAR || — || align=right data-sort-value="0.98" | 980 m || 
|-id=062 bgcolor=#fefefe
| 438062 ||  || — || September 8, 2004 || Socorro || LINEAR || MAS || align=right data-sort-value="0.88" | 880 m || 
|-id=063 bgcolor=#fefefe
| 438063 ||  || — || September 8, 2004 || Socorro || LINEAR || NYS || align=right data-sort-value="0.81" | 810 m || 
|-id=064 bgcolor=#fefefe
| 438064 ||  || — || September 8, 2004 || Socorro || LINEAR || NYS || align=right data-sort-value="0.80" | 800 m || 
|-id=065 bgcolor=#fefefe
| 438065 ||  || — || September 8, 2004 || Socorro || LINEAR || MAS || align=right data-sort-value="0.78" | 780 m || 
|-id=066 bgcolor=#fefefe
| 438066 ||  || — || September 8, 2004 || Socorro || LINEAR || — || align=right data-sort-value="0.85" | 850 m || 
|-id=067 bgcolor=#fefefe
| 438067 ||  || — || September 8, 2004 || Socorro || LINEAR || — || align=right data-sort-value="0.82" | 820 m || 
|-id=068 bgcolor=#fefefe
| 438068 ||  || — || September 8, 2004 || Socorro || LINEAR || — || align=right | 1.0 km || 
|-id=069 bgcolor=#d6d6d6
| 438069 ||  || — || September 12, 2004 || Socorro || LINEAR || — || align=right | 4.4 km || 
|-id=070 bgcolor=#fefefe
| 438070 ||  || — || September 7, 2004 || Socorro || LINEAR || — || align=right data-sort-value="0.81" | 810 m || 
|-id=071 bgcolor=#FA8072
| 438071 ||  || — || September 7, 2004 || Palomar || NEAT || — || align=right | 1.3 km || 
|-id=072 bgcolor=#fefefe
| 438072 ||  || — || September 9, 2004 || Socorro || LINEAR || NYS || align=right data-sort-value="0.78" | 780 m || 
|-id=073 bgcolor=#fefefe
| 438073 ||  || — || September 9, 2004 || Socorro || LINEAR || — || align=right data-sort-value="0.80" | 800 m || 
|-id=074 bgcolor=#d6d6d6
| 438074 ||  || — || September 11, 2004 || Socorro || LINEAR || — || align=right | 4.1 km || 
|-id=075 bgcolor=#d6d6d6
| 438075 ||  || — || September 11, 2004 || Socorro || LINEAR || — || align=right | 4.1 km || 
|-id=076 bgcolor=#fefefe
| 438076 ||  || — || September 13, 2004 || Socorro || LINEAR || — || align=right data-sort-value="0.98" | 980 m || 
|-id=077 bgcolor=#d6d6d6
| 438077 ||  || — || September 12, 2004 || Socorro || LINEAR || — || align=right | 3.4 km || 
|-id=078 bgcolor=#d6d6d6
| 438078 ||  || — || September 12, 2004 || Socorro || LINEAR || — || align=right | 4.6 km || 
|-id=079 bgcolor=#fefefe
| 438079 ||  || — || September 15, 2004 || Kitt Peak || Spacewatch || critical || align=right data-sort-value="0.59" | 590 m || 
|-id=080 bgcolor=#fefefe
| 438080 ||  || — || September 11, 2004 || Socorro || LINEAR || — || align=right | 1.5 km || 
|-id=081 bgcolor=#fefefe
| 438081 ||  || — || October 5, 2004 || Anderson Mesa || LONEOS || — || align=right data-sort-value="0.78" | 780 m || 
|-id=082 bgcolor=#fefefe
| 438082 ||  || — || October 5, 2004 || Anderson Mesa || LONEOS || — || align=right data-sort-value="0.76" | 760 m || 
|-id=083 bgcolor=#fefefe
| 438083 ||  || — || October 6, 2004 || Palomar || NEAT || — || align=right | 1.2 km || 
|-id=084 bgcolor=#d6d6d6
| 438084 ||  || — || September 18, 2004 || Socorro || LINEAR || — || align=right | 4.5 km || 
|-id=085 bgcolor=#fefefe
| 438085 ||  || — || October 4, 2004 || Kitt Peak || Spacewatch || NYS || align=right data-sort-value="0.65" | 650 m || 
|-id=086 bgcolor=#d6d6d6
| 438086 ||  || — || October 9, 2004 || Socorro || LINEAR || — || align=right | 3.3 km || 
|-id=087 bgcolor=#E9E9E9
| 438087 ||  || — || October 9, 2004 || Kitt Peak || Spacewatch || — || align=right | 1.3 km || 
|-id=088 bgcolor=#E9E9E9
| 438088 ||  || — || October 9, 2004 || Kitt Peak || Spacewatch || — || align=right | 1.1 km || 
|-id=089 bgcolor=#fefefe
| 438089 ||  || — || October 8, 2004 || Anderson Mesa || LONEOS || — || align=right | 1.0 km || 
|-id=090 bgcolor=#fefefe
| 438090 ||  || — || October 15, 2004 || Mount Lemmon || Mount Lemmon Survey || — || align=right | 1.1 km || 
|-id=091 bgcolor=#fefefe
| 438091 ||  || — || November 4, 2004 || Kitt Peak || Spacewatch || MAS || align=right data-sort-value="0.78" | 780 m || 
|-id=092 bgcolor=#d6d6d6
| 438092 ||  || — || December 1, 2004 || Catalina || CSS || 7:4 || align=right | 4.9 km || 
|-id=093 bgcolor=#fefefe
| 438093 ||  || — || December 10, 2004 || Campo Imperatore || CINEOS || — || align=right | 1.1 km || 
|-id=094 bgcolor=#E9E9E9
| 438094 ||  || — || December 13, 2004 || Anderson Mesa || LONEOS || — || align=right | 1.4 km || 
|-id=095 bgcolor=#E9E9E9
| 438095 ||  || — || December 19, 2004 || Mount Lemmon || Mount Lemmon Survey || — || align=right | 1.8 km || 
|-id=096 bgcolor=#FA8072
| 438096 ||  || — || February 2, 2005 || Kitt Peak || Spacewatch || — || align=right data-sort-value="0.90" | 900 m || 
|-id=097 bgcolor=#E9E9E9
| 438097 ||  || — || February 3, 2005 || Socorro || LINEAR || — || align=right | 1.1 km || 
|-id=098 bgcolor=#E9E9E9
| 438098 ||  || — || February 9, 2005 || Gnosca || S. Sposetti || — || align=right | 1.8 km || 
|-id=099 bgcolor=#E9E9E9
| 438099 ||  || — || February 9, 2005 || Kitt Peak || Spacewatch || — || align=right | 2.6 km || 
|-id=100 bgcolor=#E9E9E9
| 438100 ||  || — || January 17, 2005 || Kitt Peak || Spacewatch || — || align=right | 1.8 km || 
|}

438101–438200 

|-bgcolor=#E9E9E9
| 438101 ||  || — || March 3, 2005 || Kitt Peak || Spacewatch || — || align=right | 2.4 km || 
|-id=102 bgcolor=#E9E9E9
| 438102 ||  || — || March 4, 2005 || Catalina || CSS || — || align=right | 3.2 km || 
|-id=103 bgcolor=#E9E9E9
| 438103 ||  || — || March 11, 2005 || Mount Lemmon || Mount Lemmon Survey || — || align=right | 1.9 km || 
|-id=104 bgcolor=#E9E9E9
| 438104 ||  || — || March 18, 2005 || Catalina || CSS || — || align=right | 2.4 km || 
|-id=105 bgcolor=#FFC2E0
| 438105 ||  || — || April 5, 2005 || Socorro || LINEAR || APOPHA || align=right data-sort-value="0.66" | 660 m || 
|-id=106 bgcolor=#fefefe
| 438106 ||  || — || April 7, 2005 || Kitt Peak || Spacewatch || — || align=right data-sort-value="0.56" | 560 m || 
|-id=107 bgcolor=#FFC2E0
| 438107 ||  || — || April 10, 2005 || Siding Spring || SSS || APO || align=right data-sort-value="0.66" | 660 m || 
|-id=108 bgcolor=#fefefe
| 438108 ||  || — || April 10, 2005 || Catalina || CSS || — || align=right data-sort-value="0.91" | 910 m || 
|-id=109 bgcolor=#E9E9E9
| 438109 ||  || — || May 4, 2005 || Kitt Peak || Spacewatch || — || align=right | 2.0 km || 
|-id=110 bgcolor=#fefefe
| 438110 ||  || — || May 8, 2005 || Kitt Peak || Spacewatch || — || align=right data-sort-value="0.54" | 540 m || 
|-id=111 bgcolor=#fefefe
| 438111 ||  || — || April 18, 2005 || Kitt Peak || Spacewatch || — || align=right data-sort-value="0.88" | 880 m || 
|-id=112 bgcolor=#fefefe
| 438112 ||  || — || May 8, 2005 || Kitt Peak || Spacewatch || — || align=right data-sort-value="0.75" | 750 m || 
|-id=113 bgcolor=#d6d6d6
| 438113 ||  || — || June 4, 2005 || Kitt Peak || Spacewatch || — || align=right | 2.6 km || 
|-id=114 bgcolor=#fefefe
| 438114 ||  || — || June 29, 2005 || Kitt Peak || Spacewatch || — || align=right data-sort-value="0.63" | 630 m || 
|-id=115 bgcolor=#fefefe
| 438115 ||  || — || July 2, 2005 || Kitt Peak || Spacewatch || — || align=right data-sort-value="0.58" | 580 m || 
|-id=116 bgcolor=#FFC2E0
| 438116 ||  || — || July 10, 2005 || Catalina || CSS || APO +1kmcritical || align=right | 1.2 km || 
|-id=117 bgcolor=#fefefe
| 438117 ||  || — || July 5, 2005 || Palomar || NEAT || — || align=right data-sort-value="0.71" | 710 m || 
|-id=118 bgcolor=#d6d6d6
| 438118 ||  || — || July 3, 2005 || Mount Lemmon || Mount Lemmon Survey || — || align=right | 2.2 km || 
|-id=119 bgcolor=#fefefe
| 438119 ||  || — || July 31, 2005 || Palomar || NEAT || H || align=right data-sort-value="0.74" | 740 m || 
|-id=120 bgcolor=#d6d6d6
| 438120 ||  || — || August 25, 2005 || Campo Imperatore || CINEOS || — || align=right | 2.6 km || 
|-id=121 bgcolor=#fefefe
| 438121 ||  || — || August 25, 2005 || Palomar || NEAT || — || align=right data-sort-value="0.86" | 860 m || 
|-id=122 bgcolor=#d6d6d6
| 438122 ||  || — || August 27, 2005 || Kitt Peak || Spacewatch || — || align=right | 2.8 km || 
|-id=123 bgcolor=#d6d6d6
| 438123 ||  || — || August 25, 2005 || Palomar || NEAT || EOS || align=right | 2.0 km || 
|-id=124 bgcolor=#d6d6d6
| 438124 ||  || — || August 28, 2005 || Kitt Peak || Spacewatch || — || align=right | 2.6 km || 
|-id=125 bgcolor=#fefefe
| 438125 ||  || — || August 26, 2005 || Campo Imperatore || CINEOS || — || align=right data-sort-value="0.59" | 590 m || 
|-id=126 bgcolor=#fefefe
| 438126 ||  || — || August 29, 2005 || Anderson Mesa || LONEOS || H || align=right data-sort-value="0.64" | 640 m || 
|-id=127 bgcolor=#fefefe
| 438127 ||  || — || August 27, 2005 || Palomar || NEAT || — || align=right data-sort-value="0.81" | 810 m || 
|-id=128 bgcolor=#d6d6d6
| 438128 ||  || — || August 28, 2005 || Kitt Peak || Spacewatch || — || align=right | 2.4 km || 
|-id=129 bgcolor=#fefefe
| 438129 ||  || — || August 28, 2005 || Kitt Peak || Spacewatch || — || align=right data-sort-value="0.62" | 620 m || 
|-id=130 bgcolor=#d6d6d6
| 438130 ||  || — || August 28, 2005 || Kitt Peak || Spacewatch || — || align=right | 2.6 km || 
|-id=131 bgcolor=#d6d6d6
| 438131 ||  || — || August 30, 2005 || Palomar || NEAT || — || align=right | 2.9 km || 
|-id=132 bgcolor=#fefefe
| 438132 ||  || — || August 30, 2005 || Palomar || NEAT || — || align=right data-sort-value="0.65" | 650 m || 
|-id=133 bgcolor=#d6d6d6
| 438133 ||  || — || August 30, 2005 || Palomar || NEAT || — || align=right | 3.0 km || 
|-id=134 bgcolor=#d6d6d6
| 438134 ||  || — || September 3, 2005 || Bergisch Gladbach || W. Bickel || — || align=right | 3.2 km || 
|-id=135 bgcolor=#fefefe
| 438135 ||  || — || September 6, 2005 || Anderson Mesa || LONEOS || — || align=right data-sort-value="0.68" | 680 m || 
|-id=136 bgcolor=#d6d6d6
| 438136 ||  || — || September 6, 2005 || Anderson Mesa || LONEOS || — || align=right | 3.3 km || 
|-id=137 bgcolor=#fefefe
| 438137 ||  || — || August 16, 2005 || Socorro || LINEAR || — || align=right | 1.3 km || 
|-id=138 bgcolor=#d6d6d6
| 438138 ||  || — || September 11, 2005 || Kitt Peak || Spacewatch || — || align=right | 2.6 km || 
|-id=139 bgcolor=#d6d6d6
| 438139 ||  || — || September 11, 2005 || Socorro || LINEAR || LIX || align=right | 3.6 km || 
|-id=140 bgcolor=#fefefe
| 438140 ||  || — || September 23, 2005 || Kitt Peak || Spacewatch || — || align=right data-sort-value="0.65" | 650 m || 
|-id=141 bgcolor=#fefefe
| 438141 ||  || — || September 23, 2005 || Catalina || CSS || — || align=right data-sort-value="0.95" | 950 m || 
|-id=142 bgcolor=#fefefe
| 438142 ||  || — || September 23, 2005 || Kitt Peak || Spacewatch || — || align=right data-sort-value="0.78" | 780 m || 
|-id=143 bgcolor=#d6d6d6
| 438143 ||  || — || September 24, 2005 || Kitt Peak || Spacewatch || — || align=right | 2.9 km || 
|-id=144 bgcolor=#fefefe
| 438144 ||  || — || September 24, 2005 || Kitt Peak || Spacewatch || NYS || align=right data-sort-value="0.69" | 690 m || 
|-id=145 bgcolor=#fefefe
| 438145 ||  || — || September 24, 2005 || Kitt Peak || Spacewatch || — || align=right data-sort-value="0.82" | 820 m || 
|-id=146 bgcolor=#d6d6d6
| 438146 ||  || — || September 24, 2005 || Kitt Peak || Spacewatch || — || align=right | 2.9 km || 
|-id=147 bgcolor=#fefefe
| 438147 ||  || — || September 24, 2005 || Kitt Peak || Spacewatch || — || align=right data-sort-value="0.69" | 690 m || 
|-id=148 bgcolor=#fefefe
| 438148 ||  || — || September 25, 2005 || Kitt Peak || Spacewatch || — || align=right data-sort-value="0.62" | 620 m || 
|-id=149 bgcolor=#d6d6d6
| 438149 ||  || — || September 25, 2005 || Kitt Peak || Spacewatch || EOS || align=right | 1.7 km || 
|-id=150 bgcolor=#d6d6d6
| 438150 ||  || — || September 26, 2005 || Kitt Peak || Spacewatch || — || align=right | 2.4 km || 
|-id=151 bgcolor=#d6d6d6
| 438151 ||  || — || September 25, 2005 || Kitt Peak || Spacewatch || — || align=right | 2.1 km || 
|-id=152 bgcolor=#d6d6d6
| 438152 ||  || — || September 25, 2005 || Kitt Peak || Spacewatch || — || align=right | 2.9 km || 
|-id=153 bgcolor=#fefefe
| 438153 ||  || — || September 25, 2005 || Kitt Peak || Spacewatch || — || align=right data-sort-value="0.79" | 790 m || 
|-id=154 bgcolor=#d6d6d6
| 438154 ||  || — || September 26, 2005 || Kitt Peak || Spacewatch || — || align=right | 2.5 km || 
|-id=155 bgcolor=#fefefe
| 438155 ||  || — || September 25, 2005 || Catalina || CSS || — || align=right data-sort-value="0.98" | 980 m || 
|-id=156 bgcolor=#fefefe
| 438156 ||  || — || September 13, 2005 || Kitt Peak || Spacewatch || — || align=right data-sort-value="0.83" | 830 m || 
|-id=157 bgcolor=#d6d6d6
| 438157 ||  || — || August 30, 2005 || Kitt Peak || Spacewatch || — || align=right | 2.5 km || 
|-id=158 bgcolor=#fefefe
| 438158 ||  || — || September 30, 2005 || Kitt Peak || Spacewatch || — || align=right data-sort-value="0.65" | 650 m || 
|-id=159 bgcolor=#d6d6d6
| 438159 ||  || — || September 30, 2005 || Mount Lemmon || Mount Lemmon Survey || — || align=right | 2.7 km || 
|-id=160 bgcolor=#fefefe
| 438160 ||  || — || September 30, 2005 || Mount Lemmon || Mount Lemmon Survey || — || align=right data-sort-value="0.85" | 850 m || 
|-id=161 bgcolor=#fefefe
| 438161 ||  || — || September 23, 2005 || Kitt Peak || Spacewatch || — || align=right data-sort-value="0.71" | 710 m || 
|-id=162 bgcolor=#fefefe
| 438162 ||  || — || September 22, 2005 || Palomar || NEAT || — || align=right data-sort-value="0.86" | 860 m || 
|-id=163 bgcolor=#fefefe
| 438163 ||  || — || September 23, 2005 || Kitt Peak || Spacewatch || MAS || align=right data-sort-value="0.70" | 700 m || 
|-id=164 bgcolor=#d6d6d6
| 438164 ||  || — || September 29, 2005 || Catalina || CSS || — || align=right | 3.8 km || 
|-id=165 bgcolor=#FA8072
| 438165 ||  || — || September 27, 2005 || Palomar || NEAT || — || align=right data-sort-value="0.88" | 880 m || 
|-id=166 bgcolor=#d6d6d6
| 438166 ||  || — || October 2, 2005 || Palomar || NEAT || — || align=right | 3.5 km || 
|-id=167 bgcolor=#d6d6d6
| 438167 ||  || — || September 14, 2005 || Kitt Peak || Spacewatch || — || align=right | 2.4 km || 
|-id=168 bgcolor=#fefefe
| 438168 ||  || — || October 1, 2005 || Kitt Peak || Spacewatch || — || align=right data-sort-value="0.57" | 570 m || 
|-id=169 bgcolor=#d6d6d6
| 438169 ||  || — || October 1, 2005 || Mount Lemmon || Mount Lemmon Survey || — || align=right | 2.1 km || 
|-id=170 bgcolor=#d6d6d6
| 438170 ||  || — || October 1, 2005 || Mount Lemmon || Mount Lemmon Survey || — || align=right | 2.0 km || 
|-id=171 bgcolor=#d6d6d6
| 438171 ||  || — || October 2, 2005 || Palomar || NEAT || — || align=right | 4.3 km || 
|-id=172 bgcolor=#d6d6d6
| 438172 ||  || — || October 1, 2005 || Kitt Peak || Spacewatch || — || align=right | 2.5 km || 
|-id=173 bgcolor=#d6d6d6
| 438173 ||  || — || October 1, 2005 || Catalina || CSS || — || align=right | 3.0 km || 
|-id=174 bgcolor=#d6d6d6
| 438174 ||  || — || October 7, 2005 || Mount Lemmon || Mount Lemmon Survey || — || align=right | 2.9 km || 
|-id=175 bgcolor=#d6d6d6
| 438175 ||  || — || October 6, 2005 || Mount Lemmon || Mount Lemmon Survey || — || align=right | 2.3 km || 
|-id=176 bgcolor=#d6d6d6
| 438176 ||  || — || September 25, 2005 || Kitt Peak || Spacewatch || — || align=right | 2.8 km || 
|-id=177 bgcolor=#d6d6d6
| 438177 ||  || — || October 7, 2005 || Kitt Peak || Spacewatch || — || align=right | 3.1 km || 
|-id=178 bgcolor=#fefefe
| 438178 ||  || — || October 6, 2005 || Kitt Peak || Spacewatch || — || align=right data-sort-value="0.83" | 830 m || 
|-id=179 bgcolor=#fefefe
| 438179 ||  || — || October 8, 2005 || Kitt Peak || Spacewatch || — || align=right data-sort-value="0.64" | 640 m || 
|-id=180 bgcolor=#d6d6d6
| 438180 ||  || — || October 8, 2005 || Socorro || LINEAR || — || align=right | 2.2 km || 
|-id=181 bgcolor=#d6d6d6
| 438181 ||  || — || October 9, 2005 || Kitt Peak || Spacewatch || LIX || align=right | 3.2 km || 
|-id=182 bgcolor=#d6d6d6
| 438182 ||  || — || September 29, 2005 || Catalina || CSS || — || align=right | 3.9 km || 
|-id=183 bgcolor=#d6d6d6
| 438183 ||  || — || October 3, 2005 || Palomar || NEAT || — || align=right | 4.1 km || 
|-id=184 bgcolor=#fefefe
| 438184 ||  || — || October 1, 2005 || Mount Lemmon || Mount Lemmon Survey || — || align=right data-sort-value="0.68" | 680 m || 
|-id=185 bgcolor=#fefefe
| 438185 ||  || — || October 12, 2005 || Kitt Peak || Spacewatch || critical || align=right data-sort-value="0.71" | 710 m || 
|-id=186 bgcolor=#d6d6d6
| 438186 ||  || — || October 21, 2005 || Palomar || NEAT || — || align=right | 3.7 km || 
|-id=187 bgcolor=#d6d6d6
| 438187 ||  || — || October 11, 2005 || Kitt Peak || Spacewatch || EOS || align=right | 1.7 km || 
|-id=188 bgcolor=#d6d6d6
| 438188 ||  || — || September 30, 2005 || Mount Lemmon || Mount Lemmon Survey || — || align=right | 2.6 km || 
|-id=189 bgcolor=#d6d6d6
| 438189 ||  || — || October 22, 2005 || Kitt Peak || Spacewatch || THM || align=right | 2.0 km || 
|-id=190 bgcolor=#d6d6d6
| 438190 ||  || — || October 23, 2005 || Kitt Peak || Spacewatch || — || align=right | 3.4 km || 
|-id=191 bgcolor=#d6d6d6
| 438191 ||  || — || October 24, 2005 || Kitt Peak || Spacewatch || THM || align=right | 2.2 km || 
|-id=192 bgcolor=#d6d6d6
| 438192 ||  || — || October 22, 2005 || Kitt Peak || Spacewatch || — || align=right | 2.1 km || 
|-id=193 bgcolor=#d6d6d6
| 438193 ||  || — || September 29, 2005 || Mount Lemmon || Mount Lemmon Survey || — || align=right | 2.7 km || 
|-id=194 bgcolor=#d6d6d6
| 438194 ||  || — || October 22, 2005 || Kitt Peak || Spacewatch || HYG || align=right | 2.4 km || 
|-id=195 bgcolor=#d6d6d6
| 438195 ||  || — || September 25, 2005 || Kitt Peak || Spacewatch || — || align=right | 3.0 km || 
|-id=196 bgcolor=#fefefe
| 438196 ||  || — || October 22, 2005 || Catalina || CSS || H || align=right data-sort-value="0.48" | 480 m || 
|-id=197 bgcolor=#d6d6d6
| 438197 ||  || — || October 25, 2005 || Anderson Mesa || LONEOS || — || align=right | 2.6 km || 
|-id=198 bgcolor=#d6d6d6
| 438198 ||  || — || October 23, 2005 || Palomar || NEAT || — || align=right | 2.7 km || 
|-id=199 bgcolor=#d6d6d6
| 438199 ||  || — || October 5, 2005 || Kitt Peak || Spacewatch || — || align=right | 2.0 km || 
|-id=200 bgcolor=#d6d6d6
| 438200 ||  || — || October 22, 2005 || Kitt Peak || Spacewatch || — || align=right | 2.9 km || 
|}

438201–438300 

|-bgcolor=#d6d6d6
| 438201 ||  || — || October 24, 2005 || Kitt Peak || Spacewatch || — || align=right | 3.2 km || 
|-id=202 bgcolor=#fefefe
| 438202 ||  || — || October 24, 2005 || Kitt Peak || Spacewatch || — || align=right data-sort-value="0.86" | 860 m || 
|-id=203 bgcolor=#d6d6d6
| 438203 ||  || — || October 24, 2005 || Palomar || NEAT || — || align=right | 2.3 km || 
|-id=204 bgcolor=#d6d6d6
| 438204 ||  || — || October 25, 2005 || Kitt Peak || Spacewatch || — || align=right | 4.6 km || 
|-id=205 bgcolor=#d6d6d6
| 438205 ||  || — || October 30, 2005 || Goodricke-Pigott || R. A. Tucker || — || align=right | 2.9 km || 
|-id=206 bgcolor=#fefefe
| 438206 ||  || — || October 24, 2005 || Kitt Peak || Spacewatch || — || align=right data-sort-value="0.94" | 940 m || 
|-id=207 bgcolor=#d6d6d6
| 438207 ||  || — || October 25, 2005 || Mount Lemmon || Mount Lemmon Survey || HYG || align=right | 2.6 km || 
|-id=208 bgcolor=#fefefe
| 438208 ||  || — || October 1, 2005 || Mount Lemmon || Mount Lemmon Survey || — || align=right data-sort-value="0.75" | 750 m || 
|-id=209 bgcolor=#fefefe
| 438209 ||  || — || October 23, 2005 || Palomar || NEAT || — || align=right | 2.6 km || 
|-id=210 bgcolor=#d6d6d6
| 438210 ||  || — || October 25, 2005 || Kitt Peak || Spacewatch || THM || align=right | 1.9 km || 
|-id=211 bgcolor=#d6d6d6
| 438211 ||  || — || October 25, 2005 || Kitt Peak || Spacewatch || — || align=right | 2.4 km || 
|-id=212 bgcolor=#fefefe
| 438212 ||  || — || October 25, 2005 || Kitt Peak || Spacewatch || — || align=right data-sort-value="0.88" | 880 m || 
|-id=213 bgcolor=#fefefe
| 438213 ||  || — || October 25, 2005 || Kitt Peak || Spacewatch || — || align=right data-sort-value="0.69" | 690 m || 
|-id=214 bgcolor=#d6d6d6
| 438214 ||  || — || October 25, 2005 || Kitt Peak || Spacewatch || — || align=right | 3.8 km || 
|-id=215 bgcolor=#d6d6d6
| 438215 ||  || — || October 27, 2005 || Mount Lemmon || Mount Lemmon Survey || — || align=right | 3.5 km || 
|-id=216 bgcolor=#fefefe
| 438216 ||  || — || October 25, 2005 || Mount Lemmon || Mount Lemmon Survey || — || align=right data-sort-value="0.65" | 650 m || 
|-id=217 bgcolor=#fefefe
| 438217 ||  || — || October 26, 2005 || Kitt Peak || Spacewatch || — || align=right data-sort-value="0.89" | 890 m || 
|-id=218 bgcolor=#fefefe
| 438218 ||  || — || October 1, 2005 || Mount Lemmon || Mount Lemmon Survey || — || align=right data-sort-value="0.71" | 710 m || 
|-id=219 bgcolor=#d6d6d6
| 438219 ||  || — || October 30, 2005 || Kitt Peak || Spacewatch || — || align=right | 2.2 km || 
|-id=220 bgcolor=#fefefe
| 438220 ||  || — || October 31, 2005 || Mount Lemmon || Mount Lemmon Survey || — || align=right data-sort-value="0.82" | 820 m || 
|-id=221 bgcolor=#fefefe
| 438221 ||  || — || October 30, 2005 || Kitt Peak || Spacewatch || NYS || align=right data-sort-value="0.51" | 510 m || 
|-id=222 bgcolor=#d6d6d6
| 438222 ||  || — || October 28, 2005 || Kitt Peak || Spacewatch || AEG || align=right | 3.4 km || 
|-id=223 bgcolor=#d6d6d6
| 438223 ||  || — || October 26, 2005 || Palomar || NEAT || — || align=right | 3.5 km || 
|-id=224 bgcolor=#d6d6d6
| 438224 ||  || — || October 29, 2005 || Catalina || CSS || — || align=right | 3.7 km || 
|-id=225 bgcolor=#d6d6d6
| 438225 ||  || — || October 28, 2005 || Kitt Peak || Spacewatch || THM || align=right | 3.8 km || 
|-id=226 bgcolor=#fefefe
| 438226 ||  || — || October 30, 2005 || Kitt Peak || Spacewatch || V || align=right data-sort-value="0.51" | 510 m || 
|-id=227 bgcolor=#fefefe
| 438227 ||  || — || October 30, 2005 || Kitt Peak || Spacewatch || — || align=right data-sort-value="0.67" | 670 m || 
|-id=228 bgcolor=#fefefe
| 438228 ||  || — || October 31, 2005 || Mount Lemmon || Mount Lemmon Survey || NYS || align=right data-sort-value="0.63" | 630 m || 
|-id=229 bgcolor=#d6d6d6
| 438229 ||  || — || October 22, 2005 || Palomar || NEAT || — || align=right | 4.8 km || 
|-id=230 bgcolor=#fefefe
| 438230 ||  || — || October 10, 2005 || Anderson Mesa || LONEOS || — || align=right data-sort-value="0.94" | 940 m || 
|-id=231 bgcolor=#d6d6d6
| 438231 ||  || — || October 25, 2005 || Catalina || CSS || — || align=right | 4.0 km || 
|-id=232 bgcolor=#fefefe
| 438232 ||  || — || October 26, 2005 || Kitt Peak || Spacewatch || — || align=right data-sort-value="0.89" | 890 m || 
|-id=233 bgcolor=#d6d6d6
| 438233 ||  || — || October 25, 2005 || Apache Point || A. C. Becker || — || align=right | 2.8 km || 
|-id=234 bgcolor=#fefefe
| 438234 ||  || — || October 6, 2005 || Catalina || CSS || — || align=right data-sort-value="0.75" | 750 m || 
|-id=235 bgcolor=#d6d6d6
| 438235 ||  || — || October 27, 2005 || Apache Point || A. C. Becker || — || align=right | 2.7 km || 
|-id=236 bgcolor=#fefefe
| 438236 ||  || — || October 23, 2005 || Catalina || CSS || H || align=right data-sort-value="0.76" | 760 m || 
|-id=237 bgcolor=#fefefe
| 438237 ||  || — || November 4, 2005 || Kitt Peak || Spacewatch || — || align=right data-sort-value="0.78" | 780 m || 
|-id=238 bgcolor=#FA8072
| 438238 ||  || — || November 4, 2005 || Kitt Peak || Spacewatch || — || align=right data-sort-value="0.75" | 750 m || 
|-id=239 bgcolor=#fefefe
| 438239 ||  || — || October 25, 2005 || Kitt Peak || Spacewatch || V || align=right data-sort-value="0.55" | 550 m || 
|-id=240 bgcolor=#d6d6d6
| 438240 ||  || — || October 25, 2005 || Kitt Peak || Spacewatch || — || align=right | 3.0 km || 
|-id=241 bgcolor=#d6d6d6
| 438241 ||  || — || November 6, 2005 || Kitt Peak || Spacewatch || — || align=right | 3.1 km || 
|-id=242 bgcolor=#d6d6d6
| 438242 ||  || — || November 3, 2005 || Socorro || LINEAR || — || align=right | 5.2 km || 
|-id=243 bgcolor=#d6d6d6
| 438243 ||  || — || November 6, 2005 || Kitt Peak || Spacewatch || — || align=right | 3.3 km || 
|-id=244 bgcolor=#d6d6d6
| 438244 ||  || — || November 5, 2005 || Catalina || CSS || — || align=right | 3.4 km || 
|-id=245 bgcolor=#d6d6d6
| 438245 ||  || — || November 22, 2005 || Socorro || LINEAR || — || align=right | 4.2 km || 
|-id=246 bgcolor=#d6d6d6
| 438246 ||  || — || November 21, 2005 || Kitt Peak || Spacewatch || — || align=right | 3.1 km || 
|-id=247 bgcolor=#fefefe
| 438247 ||  || — || November 21, 2005 || Kitt Peak || Spacewatch || — || align=right data-sort-value="0.91" | 910 m || 
|-id=248 bgcolor=#d6d6d6
| 438248 ||  || — || November 22, 2005 || Kitt Peak || Spacewatch || THM || align=right | 2.2 km || 
|-id=249 bgcolor=#fefefe
| 438249 ||  || — || November 11, 2005 || Campo Imperatore || CINEOS || — || align=right data-sort-value="0.98" | 980 m || 
|-id=250 bgcolor=#fefefe
| 438250 ||  || — || November 26, 2005 || Catalina || CSS || V || align=right data-sort-value="0.65" | 650 m || 
|-id=251 bgcolor=#d6d6d6
| 438251 ||  || — || November 25, 2005 || Mount Lemmon || Mount Lemmon Survey || — || align=right | 3.5 km || 
|-id=252 bgcolor=#d6d6d6
| 438252 ||  || — || October 30, 2005 || Catalina || CSS || — || align=right | 4.5 km || 
|-id=253 bgcolor=#fefefe
| 438253 ||  || — || November 26, 2005 || Mount Lemmon || Mount Lemmon Survey || — || align=right data-sort-value="0.70" | 700 m || 
|-id=254 bgcolor=#fefefe
| 438254 ||  || — || September 25, 2005 || Kitt Peak || Spacewatch || — || align=right data-sort-value="0.65" | 650 m || 
|-id=255 bgcolor=#d6d6d6
| 438255 ||  || — || November 28, 2005 || Mount Lemmon || Mount Lemmon Survey || — || align=right | 5.2 km || 
|-id=256 bgcolor=#fefefe
| 438256 ||  || — || November 30, 2005 || Anderson Mesa || LONEOS || — || align=right data-sort-value="0.82" | 820 m || 
|-id=257 bgcolor=#fefefe
| 438257 ||  || — || November 28, 2005 || Catalina || CSS || — || align=right | 1.6 km || 
|-id=258 bgcolor=#d6d6d6
| 438258 ||  || — || November 26, 2005 || Mount Lemmon || Mount Lemmon Survey || — || align=right | 2.4 km || 
|-id=259 bgcolor=#d6d6d6
| 438259 ||  || — || November 25, 2005 || Kitt Peak || Spacewatch || — || align=right | 3.6 km || 
|-id=260 bgcolor=#fefefe
| 438260 ||  || — || November 29, 2005 || Kitt Peak || Spacewatch || — || align=right data-sort-value="0.79" | 790 m || 
|-id=261 bgcolor=#fefefe
| 438261 ||  || — || November 29, 2005 || Kitt Peak || Spacewatch || H || align=right data-sort-value="0.79" | 790 m || 
|-id=262 bgcolor=#fefefe
| 438262 ||  || — || November 26, 2005 || Mount Lemmon || Mount Lemmon Survey || — || align=right data-sort-value="0.95" | 950 m || 
|-id=263 bgcolor=#d6d6d6
| 438263 ||  || — || December 1, 2005 || Palomar || NEAT || — || align=right | 5.4 km || 
|-id=264 bgcolor=#d6d6d6
| 438264 ||  || — || December 1, 2005 || Socorro || LINEAR || URS || align=right | 5.4 km || 
|-id=265 bgcolor=#d6d6d6
| 438265 ||  || — || December 3, 2005 || Kitt Peak || Spacewatch || — || align=right | 4.4 km || 
|-id=266 bgcolor=#fefefe
| 438266 ||  || — || December 5, 2005 || Socorro || LINEAR || — || align=right data-sort-value="0.90" | 900 m || 
|-id=267 bgcolor=#d6d6d6
| 438267 ||  || — || December 2, 2005 || Kitt Peak || Spacewatch || — || align=right | 3.0 km || 
|-id=268 bgcolor=#d6d6d6
| 438268 ||  || — || December 1, 2005 || Kitt Peak || M. W. Buie || THM || align=right | 2.3 km || 
|-id=269 bgcolor=#fefefe
| 438269 ||  || — || December 7, 2005 || Kitt Peak || Spacewatch || — || align=right data-sort-value="0.89" | 890 m || 
|-id=270 bgcolor=#E9E9E9
| 438270 ||  || — || December 10, 2005 || Catalina || CSS || — || align=right | 1.6 km || 
|-id=271 bgcolor=#d6d6d6
| 438271 ||  || — || December 23, 2005 || Palomar || NEAT || — || align=right | 4.2 km || 
|-id=272 bgcolor=#d6d6d6
| 438272 ||  || — || December 24, 2005 || Kitt Peak || Spacewatch || — || align=right | 2.4 km || 
|-id=273 bgcolor=#E9E9E9
| 438273 ||  || — || December 24, 2005 || Kitt Peak || Spacewatch || — || align=right | 2.9 km || 
|-id=274 bgcolor=#fefefe
| 438274 ||  || — || December 24, 2005 || Kitt Peak || Spacewatch || MAS || align=right data-sort-value="0.55" | 550 m || 
|-id=275 bgcolor=#fefefe
| 438275 ||  || — || December 22, 2005 || Kitt Peak || Spacewatch || — || align=right data-sort-value="0.98" | 980 m || 
|-id=276 bgcolor=#E9E9E9
| 438276 ||  || — || December 24, 2005 || Kitt Peak || Spacewatch || — || align=right data-sort-value="0.83" | 830 m || 
|-id=277 bgcolor=#fefefe
| 438277 ||  || — || December 8, 2005 || Kitt Peak || Spacewatch || — || align=right data-sort-value="0.85" | 850 m || 
|-id=278 bgcolor=#fefefe
| 438278 ||  || — || December 26, 2005 || Kitt Peak || Spacewatch || — || align=right data-sort-value="0.98" | 980 m || 
|-id=279 bgcolor=#d6d6d6
| 438279 ||  || — || December 25, 2005 || Kitt Peak || Spacewatch || — || align=right | 3.6 km || 
|-id=280 bgcolor=#fefefe
| 438280 ||  || — || December 10, 2005 || Kitt Peak || Spacewatch || H || align=right data-sort-value="0.51" | 510 m || 
|-id=281 bgcolor=#E9E9E9
| 438281 ||  || — || December 25, 2005 || Kitt Peak || Spacewatch || — || align=right data-sort-value="0.87" | 870 m || 
|-id=282 bgcolor=#d6d6d6
| 438282 ||  || — || December 24, 2005 || Socorro || LINEAR || — || align=right | 3.2 km || 
|-id=283 bgcolor=#d6d6d6
| 438283 ||  || — || December 29, 2005 || Socorro || LINEAR || — || align=right | 2.5 km || 
|-id=284 bgcolor=#E9E9E9
| 438284 ||  || — || January 2, 2006 || Catalina || CSS || — || align=right | 1.6 km || 
|-id=285 bgcolor=#fefefe
| 438285 ||  || — || January 5, 2006 || Kitt Peak || Spacewatch || — || align=right data-sort-value="0.87" | 870 m || 
|-id=286 bgcolor=#fefefe
| 438286 ||  || — || January 4, 2006 || Kitt Peak || Spacewatch || — || align=right data-sort-value="0.89" | 890 m || 
|-id=287 bgcolor=#d6d6d6
| 438287 ||  || — || January 5, 2006 || Kitt Peak || Spacewatch || (1298) || align=right | 2.9 km || 
|-id=288 bgcolor=#E9E9E9
| 438288 ||  || — || January 9, 2006 || Kitt Peak || Spacewatch || — || align=right data-sort-value="0.94" | 940 m || 
|-id=289 bgcolor=#d6d6d6
| 438289 ||  || — || January 6, 2006 || Kitt Peak || Spacewatch || — || align=right | 3.8 km || 
|-id=290 bgcolor=#d6d6d6
| 438290 ||  || — || January 3, 2006 || Socorro || LINEAR || Tj (2.98) || align=right | 4.7 km || 
|-id=291 bgcolor=#E9E9E9
| 438291 ||  || — || January 7, 2006 || Mount Lemmon || Mount Lemmon Survey || (5) || align=right data-sort-value="0.70" | 700 m || 
|-id=292 bgcolor=#E9E9E9
| 438292 ||  || — || January 22, 2006 || Mount Lemmon || Mount Lemmon Survey || — || align=right data-sort-value="0.86" | 860 m || 
|-id=293 bgcolor=#E9E9E9
| 438293 ||  || — || January 21, 2006 || Kitt Peak || Spacewatch || — || align=right | 2.0 km || 
|-id=294 bgcolor=#E9E9E9
| 438294 ||  || — || January 20, 2006 || Catalina || CSS || — || align=right data-sort-value="0.94" | 940 m || 
|-id=295 bgcolor=#d6d6d6
| 438295 ||  || — || January 31, 2006 || Kitt Peak || Spacewatch || 7:4 || align=right | 3.7 km || 
|-id=296 bgcolor=#E9E9E9
| 438296 ||  || — || January 30, 2006 || Kitt Peak || Spacewatch || — || align=right | 1.1 km || 
|-id=297 bgcolor=#E9E9E9
| 438297 ||  || — || February 2, 2006 || Kitt Peak || Spacewatch || — || align=right | 1.3 km || 
|-id=298 bgcolor=#E9E9E9
| 438298 ||  || — || February 6, 2006 || Mount Lemmon || Mount Lemmon Survey || — || align=right data-sort-value="0.83" | 830 m || 
|-id=299 bgcolor=#E9E9E9
| 438299 ||  || — || February 20, 2006 || Mount Lemmon || Mount Lemmon Survey || — || align=right | 1.8 km || 
|-id=300 bgcolor=#E9E9E9
| 438300 ||  || — || February 20, 2006 || Mount Lemmon || Mount Lemmon Survey || — || align=right | 1.3 km || 
|}

438301–438400 

|-bgcolor=#E9E9E9
| 438301 ||  || — || February 22, 2006 || Anderson Mesa || LONEOS || ADE || align=right | 3.0 km || 
|-id=302 bgcolor=#E9E9E9
| 438302 ||  || — || February 25, 2006 || Mount Lemmon || Mount Lemmon Survey || — || align=right data-sort-value="0.85" | 850 m || 
|-id=303 bgcolor=#E9E9E9
| 438303 ||  || — || February 25, 2006 || Kitt Peak || Spacewatch || — || align=right | 1.2 km || 
|-id=304 bgcolor=#E9E9E9
| 438304 ||  || — || February 25, 2006 || Kitt Peak || Spacewatch || — || align=right | 1.3 km || 
|-id=305 bgcolor=#E9E9E9
| 438305 ||  || — || February 25, 2006 || Kitt Peak || Spacewatch || — || align=right | 1.6 km || 
|-id=306 bgcolor=#E9E9E9
| 438306 ||  || — || March 3, 2006 || Kitt Peak || Spacewatch || — || align=right data-sort-value="0.83" | 830 m || 
|-id=307 bgcolor=#E9E9E9
| 438307 ||  || — || March 23, 2006 || Kitt Peak || Spacewatch || — || align=right data-sort-value="0.98" | 980 m || 
|-id=308 bgcolor=#E9E9E9
| 438308 ||  || — || April 19, 2006 || Kitt Peak || Spacewatch || — || align=right | 1.8 km || 
|-id=309 bgcolor=#E9E9E9
| 438309 ||  || — || April 20, 2006 || Kitt Peak || Spacewatch || — || align=right | 1.7 km || 
|-id=310 bgcolor=#E9E9E9
| 438310 ||  || — || April 25, 2006 || Kitt Peak || Spacewatch || — || align=right | 1.5 km || 
|-id=311 bgcolor=#E9E9E9
| 438311 ||  || — || April 26, 2006 || Kitt Peak || Spacewatch || — || align=right | 1.8 km || 
|-id=312 bgcolor=#E9E9E9
| 438312 ||  || — || April 30, 2006 || Kitt Peak || Spacewatch || — || align=right | 1.2 km || 
|-id=313 bgcolor=#E9E9E9
| 438313 ||  || — || April 20, 2006 || Siding Spring || SSS || — || align=right | 2.0 km || 
|-id=314 bgcolor=#E9E9E9
| 438314 ||  || — || April 26, 2006 || Mount Lemmon || Mount Lemmon Survey || — || align=right | 2.0 km || 
|-id=315 bgcolor=#E9E9E9
| 438315 ||  || — || April 27, 2006 || Cerro Tololo || M. W. Buie || — || align=right data-sort-value="0.91" | 910 m || 
|-id=316 bgcolor=#E9E9E9
| 438316 ||  || — || April 30, 2006 || Kitt Peak || Spacewatch || — || align=right | 1.1 km || 
|-id=317 bgcolor=#FFC2E0
| 438317 ||  || — || May 4, 2006 || Siding Spring || SSS || AMOcritical || align=right data-sort-value="0.37" | 370 m || 
|-id=318 bgcolor=#E9E9E9
| 438318 ||  || — || May 2, 2006 || Mount Lemmon || Mount Lemmon Survey || — || align=right | 1.5 km || 
|-id=319 bgcolor=#FA8072
| 438319 ||  || — || May 14, 2006 || Palomar || NEAT || — || align=right | 1.5 km || 
|-id=320 bgcolor=#E9E9E9
| 438320 ||  || — || May 19, 2006 || Mount Lemmon || Mount Lemmon Survey || — || align=right | 2.0 km || 
|-id=321 bgcolor=#E9E9E9
| 438321 ||  || — || May 8, 2006 || Siding Spring || SSS || JUN || align=right | 1.1 km || 
|-id=322 bgcolor=#E9E9E9
| 438322 ||  || — || May 9, 2006 || Mount Lemmon || Mount Lemmon Survey || — || align=right | 1.6 km || 
|-id=323 bgcolor=#E9E9E9
| 438323 ||  || — || May 20, 2006 || Kitt Peak || Spacewatch || — || align=right | 1.1 km || 
|-id=324 bgcolor=#E9E9E9
| 438324 ||  || — || April 30, 2006 || Kitt Peak || Spacewatch || — || align=right | 2.3 km || 
|-id=325 bgcolor=#E9E9E9
| 438325 ||  || — || May 21, 2006 || Kitt Peak || Spacewatch || JUN || align=right data-sort-value="0.93" | 930 m || 
|-id=326 bgcolor=#E9E9E9
| 438326 ||  || — || May 21, 2006 || Kitt Peak || Spacewatch || — || align=right | 1.4 km || 
|-id=327 bgcolor=#E9E9E9
| 438327 ||  || — || May 21, 2006 || Kitt Peak || Spacewatch || — || align=right | 1.3 km || 
|-id=328 bgcolor=#E9E9E9
| 438328 ||  || — || May 21, 2006 || Kitt Peak || Spacewatch || — || align=right | 1.9 km || 
|-id=329 bgcolor=#E9E9E9
| 438329 ||  || — || May 24, 2006 || Kitt Peak || Spacewatch || — || align=right | 2.1 km || 
|-id=330 bgcolor=#E9E9E9
| 438330 ||  || — || May 20, 2006 || Mount Lemmon || Mount Lemmon Survey || — || align=right | 1.5 km || 
|-id=331 bgcolor=#E9E9E9
| 438331 ||  || — || May 21, 2006 || Palomar || NEAT || — || align=right | 1.6 km || 
|-id=332 bgcolor=#E9E9E9
| 438332 ||  || — || May 30, 2006 || Nyukasa || Mount Nyukasa Stn. || — || align=right | 2.4 km || 
|-id=333 bgcolor=#E9E9E9
| 438333 ||  || — || May 9, 2006 || Mount Lemmon || Mount Lemmon Survey || — || align=right | 1.5 km || 
|-id=334 bgcolor=#E9E9E9
| 438334 ||  || — || May 25, 2006 || Mauna Kea || P. A. Wiegert || — || align=right | 2.8 km || 
|-id=335 bgcolor=#E9E9E9
| 438335 ||  || — || June 19, 2006 || Kitt Peak || Spacewatch || — || align=right | 1.5 km || 
|-id=336 bgcolor=#E9E9E9
| 438336 ||  || — || May 26, 2006 || Mount Lemmon || Mount Lemmon Survey || — || align=right | 1.8 km || 
|-id=337 bgcolor=#E9E9E9
| 438337 ||  || — || August 13, 2006 || Palomar || NEAT || — || align=right | 2.3 km || 
|-id=338 bgcolor=#d6d6d6
| 438338 ||  || — || August 21, 2006 || Kitt Peak || Spacewatch || KOR || align=right | 1.5 km || 
|-id=339 bgcolor=#E9E9E9
| 438339 ||  || — || August 24, 2006 || Socorro || LINEAR || DOR || align=right | 2.2 km || 
|-id=340 bgcolor=#E9E9E9
| 438340 ||  || — || August 27, 2006 || Lulin || H.-C. Lin, Q.-z. Ye || — || align=right | 2.3 km || 
|-id=341 bgcolor=#E9E9E9
| 438341 ||  || — || August 29, 2006 || Anderson Mesa || LONEOS || — || align=right | 2.3 km || 
|-id=342 bgcolor=#FA8072
| 438342 ||  || — || August 27, 2006 || Anderson Mesa || LONEOS || — || align=right data-sort-value="0.41" | 410 m || 
|-id=343 bgcolor=#E9E9E9
| 438343 ||  || — || May 25, 2006 || Mount Lemmon || Mount Lemmon Survey || — || align=right | 2.3 km || 
|-id=344 bgcolor=#d6d6d6
| 438344 ||  || — || September 14, 2006 || Kitt Peak || Spacewatch || — || align=right | 2.7 km || 
|-id=345 bgcolor=#fefefe
| 438345 ||  || — || July 21, 2006 || Mount Lemmon || Mount Lemmon Survey || — || align=right data-sort-value="0.74" | 740 m || 
|-id=346 bgcolor=#E9E9E9
| 438346 ||  || — || September 14, 2006 || Kitt Peak || Spacewatch || — || align=right | 2.5 km || 
|-id=347 bgcolor=#fefefe
| 438347 ||  || — || September 15, 2006 || Kitt Peak || Spacewatch || — || align=right data-sort-value="0.94" | 940 m || 
|-id=348 bgcolor=#d6d6d6
| 438348 ||  || — || September 14, 2006 || Mauna Kea || J. Masiero || — || align=right | 2.3 km || 
|-id=349 bgcolor=#d6d6d6
| 438349 ||  || — || September 14, 2006 || Mauna Kea || J. Masiero || THM || align=right | 1.9 km || 
|-id=350 bgcolor=#d6d6d6
| 438350 ||  || — || September 18, 2006 || Kitt Peak || Spacewatch || — || align=right | 3.0 km || 
|-id=351 bgcolor=#E9E9E9
| 438351 ||  || — || September 16, 2006 || Catalina || CSS || — || align=right | 2.5 km || 
|-id=352 bgcolor=#fefefe
| 438352 ||  || — || September 17, 2006 || Kitt Peak || Spacewatch || — || align=right data-sort-value="0.54" | 540 m || 
|-id=353 bgcolor=#E9E9E9
| 438353 ||  || — || September 18, 2006 || Anderson Mesa || LONEOS || — || align=right | 2.6 km || 
|-id=354 bgcolor=#E9E9E9
| 438354 ||  || — || August 28, 2006 || Anderson Mesa || LONEOS || — || align=right | 2.5 km || 
|-id=355 bgcolor=#fefefe
| 438355 ||  || — || September 23, 2006 || Kitt Peak || Spacewatch || — || align=right data-sort-value="0.59" | 590 m || 
|-id=356 bgcolor=#d6d6d6
| 438356 ||  || — || September 23, 2006 || Kitt Peak || Spacewatch || — || align=right | 2.6 km || 
|-id=357 bgcolor=#E9E9E9
| 438357 ||  || — || September 26, 2006 || Kitt Peak || Spacewatch || — || align=right | 2.6 km || 
|-id=358 bgcolor=#d6d6d6
| 438358 ||  || — || September 18, 2006 || Kitt Peak || Spacewatch || — || align=right | 2.1 km || 
|-id=359 bgcolor=#d6d6d6
| 438359 ||  || — || September 18, 2006 || Kitt Peak || Spacewatch || — || align=right | 2.4 km || 
|-id=360 bgcolor=#d6d6d6
| 438360 ||  || — || September 26, 2006 || Kitt Peak || Spacewatch || EOS || align=right | 1.5 km || 
|-id=361 bgcolor=#d6d6d6
| 438361 ||  || — || September 27, 2006 || Mount Lemmon || Mount Lemmon Survey || — || align=right | 2.0 km || 
|-id=362 bgcolor=#E9E9E9
| 438362 ||  || — || September 27, 2006 || Mount Lemmon || Mount Lemmon Survey || — || align=right | 2.7 km || 
|-id=363 bgcolor=#d6d6d6
| 438363 ||  || — || September 27, 2006 || Kitt Peak || Spacewatch || — || align=right | 3.2 km || 
|-id=364 bgcolor=#d6d6d6
| 438364 ||  || — || September 17, 2006 || Kitt Peak || Spacewatch || — || align=right | 2.5 km || 
|-id=365 bgcolor=#d6d6d6
| 438365 ||  || — || September 17, 2006 || Kitt Peak || Spacewatch || KOR || align=right | 1.3 km || 
|-id=366 bgcolor=#d6d6d6
| 438366 ||  || — || September 17, 2006 || Kitt Peak || Spacewatch || — || align=right | 2.3 km || 
|-id=367 bgcolor=#d6d6d6
| 438367 ||  || — || September 27, 2006 || Kitt Peak || Spacewatch || EOS || align=right | 1.8 km || 
|-id=368 bgcolor=#d6d6d6
| 438368 ||  || — || September 28, 2006 || Kitt Peak || Spacewatch || — || align=right | 3.2 km || 
|-id=369 bgcolor=#d6d6d6
| 438369 ||  || — || September 18, 2006 || Apache Point || A. C. Becker || EOS || align=right | 1.4 km || 
|-id=370 bgcolor=#d6d6d6
| 438370 ||  || — || September 19, 2006 || Catalina || CSS || — || align=right | 2.4 km || 
|-id=371 bgcolor=#E9E9E9
| 438371 ||  || — || October 2, 2006 || Mount Lemmon || Mount Lemmon Survey || — || align=right | 2.2 km || 
|-id=372 bgcolor=#d6d6d6
| 438372 ||  || — || September 19, 2006 || Kitt Peak || Spacewatch || — || align=right | 3.0 km || 
|-id=373 bgcolor=#d6d6d6
| 438373 ||  || — || September 26, 2006 || Mount Lemmon || Mount Lemmon Survey || — || align=right | 2.2 km || 
|-id=374 bgcolor=#d6d6d6
| 438374 ||  || — || October 12, 2006 || Kitt Peak || Spacewatch || — || align=right | 2.8 km || 
|-id=375 bgcolor=#d6d6d6
| 438375 ||  || — || October 12, 2006 || Kitt Peak || Spacewatch || — || align=right | 2.1 km || 
|-id=376 bgcolor=#d6d6d6
| 438376 ||  || — || October 13, 2006 || Kitt Peak || Spacewatch || — || align=right | 2.6 km || 
|-id=377 bgcolor=#fefefe
| 438377 ||  || — || October 13, 2006 || Kitt Peak || Spacewatch || — || align=right data-sort-value="0.62" | 620 m || 
|-id=378 bgcolor=#d6d6d6
| 438378 ||  || — || October 13, 2006 || Kitt Peak || Spacewatch || — || align=right | 2.7 km || 
|-id=379 bgcolor=#d6d6d6
| 438379 ||  || — || October 15, 2006 || Kitt Peak || Spacewatch || — || align=right | 2.2 km || 
|-id=380 bgcolor=#d6d6d6
| 438380 ||  || — || October 15, 2006 || Kitt Peak || Spacewatch || — || align=right | 2.3 km || 
|-id=381 bgcolor=#d6d6d6
| 438381 ||  || — || October 1, 2006 || Apache Point || A. C. Becker || EOS || align=right | 1.7 km || 
|-id=382 bgcolor=#d6d6d6
| 438382 ||  || — || October 2, 2006 || Mount Lemmon || Mount Lemmon Survey || — || align=right | 2.7 km || 
|-id=383 bgcolor=#d6d6d6
| 438383 ||  || — || October 2, 2006 || Mount Lemmon || Mount Lemmon Survey || — || align=right | 3.3 km || 
|-id=384 bgcolor=#d6d6d6
| 438384 ||  || — || October 4, 2006 || Mount Lemmon || Mount Lemmon Survey || — || align=right | 3.4 km || 
|-id=385 bgcolor=#d6d6d6
| 438385 ||  || — || October 16, 2006 || Catalina || CSS || — || align=right | 3.3 km || 
|-id=386 bgcolor=#d6d6d6
| 438386 ||  || — || March 29, 2004 || Kitt Peak || Spacewatch || — || align=right | 2.4 km || 
|-id=387 bgcolor=#d6d6d6
| 438387 ||  || — || October 3, 2006 || Kitt Peak || Spacewatch || EOS || align=right | 1.5 km || 
|-id=388 bgcolor=#d6d6d6
| 438388 ||  || — || September 30, 2006 || Mount Lemmon || Mount Lemmon Survey || — || align=right | 3.1 km || 
|-id=389 bgcolor=#d6d6d6
| 438389 ||  || — || October 16, 2006 || Kitt Peak || Spacewatch || — || align=right | 2.7 km || 
|-id=390 bgcolor=#d6d6d6
| 438390 ||  || — || September 27, 2006 || Mount Lemmon || Mount Lemmon Survey || VER || align=right | 2.7 km || 
|-id=391 bgcolor=#d6d6d6
| 438391 ||  || — || September 25, 2006 || Mount Lemmon || Mount Lemmon Survey || — || align=right | 2.0 km || 
|-id=392 bgcolor=#d6d6d6
| 438392 ||  || — || October 17, 2006 || Kitt Peak || Spacewatch || EOS || align=right | 2.2 km || 
|-id=393 bgcolor=#d6d6d6
| 438393 ||  || — || October 23, 2006 || Kitami || K. Endate || — || align=right | 3.1 km || 
|-id=394 bgcolor=#d6d6d6
| 438394 ||  || — || September 26, 2006 || Kitt Peak || Spacewatch || — || align=right | 2.2 km || 
|-id=395 bgcolor=#d6d6d6
| 438395 ||  || — || October 4, 2006 || Mount Lemmon || Mount Lemmon Survey || — || align=right | 2.7 km || 
|-id=396 bgcolor=#E9E9E9
| 438396 ||  || — || October 17, 2006 || Mount Lemmon || Mount Lemmon Survey || — || align=right | 2.1 km || 
|-id=397 bgcolor=#d6d6d6
| 438397 ||  || — || October 3, 2006 || Mount Lemmon || Mount Lemmon Survey || — || align=right | 1.9 km || 
|-id=398 bgcolor=#d6d6d6
| 438398 ||  || — || September 27, 2006 || Mount Lemmon || Mount Lemmon Survey || — || align=right | 2.4 km || 
|-id=399 bgcolor=#E9E9E9
| 438399 ||  || — || October 19, 2006 || Palomar || NEAT || — || align=right | 1.8 km || 
|-id=400 bgcolor=#d6d6d6
| 438400 ||  || — || October 2, 2006 || Mount Lemmon || Mount Lemmon Survey || — || align=right | 2.5 km || 
|}

438401–438500 

|-bgcolor=#d6d6d6
| 438401 ||  || — || September 28, 2006 || Catalina || CSS || — || align=right | 3.9 km || 
|-id=402 bgcolor=#d6d6d6
| 438402 ||  || — || October 2, 2006 || Mount Lemmon || Mount Lemmon Survey || — || align=right | 3.4 km || 
|-id=403 bgcolor=#d6d6d6
| 438403 ||  || — || October 23, 2006 || Kitt Peak || Spacewatch || — || align=right | 3.4 km || 
|-id=404 bgcolor=#d6d6d6
| 438404 ||  || — || October 23, 2006 || Kitt Peak || Spacewatch || — || align=right | 3.1 km || 
|-id=405 bgcolor=#d6d6d6
| 438405 ||  || — || October 16, 2006 || Kitt Peak || Spacewatch || — || align=right | 2.6 km || 
|-id=406 bgcolor=#fefefe
| 438406 ||  || — || October 29, 2006 || Mount Lemmon || Mount Lemmon Survey || critical || align=right data-sort-value="0.54" | 540 m || 
|-id=407 bgcolor=#d6d6d6
| 438407 ||  || — || October 21, 2006 || Apache Point || A. C. Becker || EOS || align=right | 1.5 km || 
|-id=408 bgcolor=#d6d6d6
| 438408 ||  || — || October 27, 2006 || Kitt Peak || Spacewatch || — || align=right | 3.3 km || 
|-id=409 bgcolor=#d6d6d6
| 438409 ||  || — || October 4, 2006 || Mount Lemmon || Mount Lemmon Survey || — || align=right | 2.5 km || 
|-id=410 bgcolor=#d6d6d6
| 438410 ||  || — || October 4, 2006 || Mount Lemmon || Mount Lemmon Survey || — || align=right | 3.0 km || 
|-id=411 bgcolor=#d6d6d6
| 438411 ||  || — || October 17, 2006 || Mount Lemmon || Mount Lemmon Survey || — || align=right | 3.7 km || 
|-id=412 bgcolor=#d6d6d6
| 438412 ||  || — || October 19, 2006 || Catalina || CSS || — || align=right | 4.1 km || 
|-id=413 bgcolor=#d6d6d6
| 438413 ||  || — || September 27, 2006 || Mount Lemmon || Mount Lemmon Survey || — || align=right | 2.8 km || 
|-id=414 bgcolor=#d6d6d6
| 438414 ||  || — || November 9, 2006 || Kitt Peak || Spacewatch || EOS || align=right | 1.8 km || 
|-id=415 bgcolor=#fefefe
| 438415 ||  || — || November 10, 2006 || Kitt Peak || Spacewatch || — || align=right data-sort-value="0.66" | 660 m || 
|-id=416 bgcolor=#d6d6d6
| 438416 ||  || — || November 11, 2006 || Kitt Peak || Spacewatch || — || align=right | 3.2 km || 
|-id=417 bgcolor=#fefefe
| 438417 ||  || — || November 11, 2006 || Kitt Peak || Spacewatch || — || align=right data-sort-value="0.61" | 610 m || 
|-id=418 bgcolor=#d6d6d6
| 438418 ||  || — || October 31, 2006 || Mount Lemmon || Mount Lemmon Survey || — || align=right | 3.3 km || 
|-id=419 bgcolor=#d6d6d6
| 438419 ||  || — || November 11, 2006 || Kitt Peak || Spacewatch || — || align=right | 4.1 km || 
|-id=420 bgcolor=#fefefe
| 438420 ||  || — || November 12, 2006 || Mount Lemmon || Mount Lemmon Survey || — || align=right data-sort-value="0.78" | 780 m || 
|-id=421 bgcolor=#d6d6d6
| 438421 ||  || — || November 12, 2006 || Mount Lemmon || Mount Lemmon Survey || — || align=right | 2.3 km || 
|-id=422 bgcolor=#d6d6d6
| 438422 ||  || — || October 23, 2006 || Kitt Peak || Spacewatch || — || align=right | 2.3 km || 
|-id=423 bgcolor=#d6d6d6
| 438423 ||  || — || November 14, 2006 || La Sagra || OAM Obs. || — || align=right | 3.7 km || 
|-id=424 bgcolor=#d6d6d6
| 438424 ||  || — || October 23, 2006 || Mount Lemmon || Mount Lemmon Survey || — || align=right | 3.0 km || 
|-id=425 bgcolor=#d6d6d6
| 438425 ||  || — || November 13, 2006 || Kitt Peak || Spacewatch || — || align=right | 2.6 km || 
|-id=426 bgcolor=#d6d6d6
| 438426 ||  || — || October 20, 2006 || Mount Lemmon || Mount Lemmon Survey || — || align=right | 3.3 km || 
|-id=427 bgcolor=#d6d6d6
| 438427 ||  || — || October 19, 2006 || Mount Lemmon || Mount Lemmon Survey || EOS || align=right | 1.8 km || 
|-id=428 bgcolor=#d6d6d6
| 438428 ||  || — || November 1, 2006 || Mount Lemmon || Mount Lemmon Survey || — || align=right | 6.6 km || 
|-id=429 bgcolor=#FFC2E0
| 438429 ||  || — || November 17, 2006 || Kitt Peak || Spacewatch || AMO || align=right data-sort-value="0.60" | 600 m || 
|-id=430 bgcolor=#FFC2E0
| 438430 ||  || — || November 19, 2006 || Mount Lemmon || Mount Lemmon Survey || AMO || align=right data-sort-value="0.37" | 370 m || 
|-id=431 bgcolor=#d6d6d6
| 438431 ||  || — || November 19, 2006 || Mount Lemmon || Mount Lemmon Survey || — || align=right | 4.6 km || 
|-id=432 bgcolor=#fefefe
| 438432 ||  || — || November 20, 2006 || Calvin-Rehoboth || L. A. Molnar || — || align=right data-sort-value="0.54" | 540 m || 
|-id=433 bgcolor=#fefefe
| 438433 ||  || — || November 16, 2006 || Mount Lemmon || Mount Lemmon Survey || — || align=right data-sort-value="0.94" | 940 m || 
|-id=434 bgcolor=#fefefe
| 438434 ||  || — || November 17, 2006 || Kitt Peak || Spacewatch || — || align=right | 1.1 km || 
|-id=435 bgcolor=#fefefe
| 438435 ||  || — || September 27, 2006 || Mount Lemmon || Mount Lemmon Survey || — || align=right data-sort-value="0.68" | 680 m || 
|-id=436 bgcolor=#d6d6d6
| 438436 ||  || — || November 19, 2006 || Kitt Peak || Spacewatch || — || align=right | 2.7 km || 
|-id=437 bgcolor=#d6d6d6
| 438437 ||  || — || November 19, 2006 || Kitt Peak || Spacewatch || — || align=right | 2.6 km || 
|-id=438 bgcolor=#d6d6d6
| 438438 ||  || — || November 20, 2006 || Kitt Peak || Spacewatch || — || align=right | 2.8 km || 
|-id=439 bgcolor=#d6d6d6
| 438439 ||  || — || November 20, 2006 || Siding Spring || SSS || — || align=right | 3.6 km || 
|-id=440 bgcolor=#d6d6d6
| 438440 ||  || — || September 28, 2006 || Mount Lemmon || Mount Lemmon Survey || — || align=right | 2.9 km || 
|-id=441 bgcolor=#d6d6d6
| 438441 ||  || — || November 22, 2006 || Mount Lemmon || Mount Lemmon Survey || — || align=right | 3.1 km || 
|-id=442 bgcolor=#fefefe
| 438442 ||  || — || November 23, 2006 || Catalina || CSS || — || align=right data-sort-value="0.68" | 680 m || 
|-id=443 bgcolor=#d6d6d6
| 438443 ||  || — || October 31, 2006 || Mount Lemmon || Mount Lemmon Survey || — || align=right | 3.2 km || 
|-id=444 bgcolor=#fefefe
| 438444 ||  || — || November 19, 2006 || Kitt Peak || Spacewatch || — || align=right data-sort-value="0.65" | 650 m || 
|-id=445 bgcolor=#d6d6d6
| 438445 ||  || — || November 16, 2006 || Kitt Peak || Spacewatch || — || align=right | 3.4 km || 
|-id=446 bgcolor=#d6d6d6
| 438446 ||  || — || November 10, 2006 || Kitt Peak || Spacewatch || — || align=right | 3.4 km || 
|-id=447 bgcolor=#fefefe
| 438447 ||  || — || November 28, 2006 || Socorro || LINEAR || — || align=right | 1.5 km || 
|-id=448 bgcolor=#fefefe
| 438448 ||  || — || December 14, 2006 || Socorro || LINEAR || — || align=right data-sort-value="0.76" | 760 m || 
|-id=449 bgcolor=#d6d6d6
| 438449 ||  || — || December 17, 2006 || 7300 || W. K. Y. Yeung || — || align=right | 3.1 km || 
|-id=450 bgcolor=#fefefe
| 438450 ||  || — || December 20, 2006 || Palomar || NEAT || — || align=right data-sort-value="0.81" | 810 m || 
|-id=451 bgcolor=#fefefe
| 438451 ||  || — || November 15, 2006 || Mount Lemmon || Mount Lemmon Survey || — || align=right data-sort-value="0.92" | 920 m || 
|-id=452 bgcolor=#FFC2E0
| 438452 ||  || — || January 15, 2007 || Anderson Mesa || LONEOS || AMO || align=right data-sort-value="0.50" | 500 m || 
|-id=453 bgcolor=#fefefe
| 438453 ||  || — || December 16, 2006 || Mount Lemmon || Mount Lemmon Survey || — || align=right data-sort-value="0.71" | 710 m || 
|-id=454 bgcolor=#d6d6d6
| 438454 ||  || — || January 9, 2007 || Mount Lemmon || Mount Lemmon Survey || THM || align=right | 2.1 km || 
|-id=455 bgcolor=#d6d6d6
| 438455 ||  || — || November 18, 2006 || Mount Lemmon || Mount Lemmon Survey || — || align=right | 3.0 km || 
|-id=456 bgcolor=#d6d6d6
| 438456 ||  || — || January 24, 2007 || Mount Lemmon || Mount Lemmon Survey || — || align=right | 2.9 km || 
|-id=457 bgcolor=#fefefe
| 438457 ||  || — || December 21, 2006 || Kitt Peak || Spacewatch || — || align=right data-sort-value="0.68" | 680 m || 
|-id=458 bgcolor=#fefefe
| 438458 ||  || — || December 27, 2006 || Mount Lemmon || Mount Lemmon Survey || (2076) || align=right data-sort-value="0.64" | 640 m || 
|-id=459 bgcolor=#fefefe
| 438459 ||  || — || January 27, 2007 || Mount Lemmon || Mount Lemmon Survey || — || align=right data-sort-value="0.79" | 790 m || 
|-id=460 bgcolor=#d6d6d6
| 438460 ||  || — || January 27, 2007 || Kitt Peak || Spacewatch || — || align=right | 4.4 km || 
|-id=461 bgcolor=#d6d6d6
| 438461 ||  || — || January 10, 2007 || Kitt Peak || Spacewatch || — || align=right | 3.1 km || 
|-id=462 bgcolor=#d6d6d6
| 438462 ||  || — || January 10, 2007 || Mount Lemmon || Mount Lemmon Survey || EOS || align=right | 2.7 km || 
|-id=463 bgcolor=#fefefe
| 438463 ||  || — || January 27, 2007 || Kitt Peak || Spacewatch || MAS || align=right data-sort-value="0.68" | 680 m || 
|-id=464 bgcolor=#fefefe
| 438464 ||  || — || February 16, 2007 || Catalina || CSS || — || align=right | 1.1 km || 
|-id=465 bgcolor=#d6d6d6
| 438465 ||  || — || February 16, 2007 || Palomar || NEAT || — || align=right | 3.9 km || 
|-id=466 bgcolor=#fefefe
| 438466 ||  || — || February 17, 2007 || Kitt Peak || Spacewatch || — || align=right data-sort-value="0.67" | 670 m || 
|-id=467 bgcolor=#fefefe
| 438467 ||  || — || February 22, 2007 || Kitt Peak || Spacewatch || — || align=right data-sort-value="0.86" | 860 m || 
|-id=468 bgcolor=#fefefe
| 438468 ||  || — || February 21, 2007 || Kitt Peak || Spacewatch || — || align=right data-sort-value="0.75" | 750 m || 
|-id=469 bgcolor=#fefefe
| 438469 ||  || — || February 17, 2007 || Kitt Peak || Spacewatch || — || align=right data-sort-value="0.78" | 780 m || 
|-id=470 bgcolor=#fefefe
| 438470 ||  || — || December 27, 2006 || Mount Lemmon || Mount Lemmon Survey || — || align=right data-sort-value="0.82" | 820 m || 
|-id=471 bgcolor=#fefefe
| 438471 ||  || — || March 9, 2007 || Catalina || CSS || — || align=right | 2.6 km || 
|-id=472 bgcolor=#fefefe
| 438472 ||  || — || March 10, 2007 || Mount Lemmon || Mount Lemmon Survey || — || align=right data-sort-value="0.78" | 780 m || 
|-id=473 bgcolor=#fefefe
| 438473 ||  || — || March 10, 2007 || Kitt Peak || Spacewatch || MAS || align=right data-sort-value="0.73" | 730 m || 
|-id=474 bgcolor=#fefefe
| 438474 ||  || — || March 12, 2007 || Catalina || CSS || — || align=right data-sort-value="0.85" | 850 m || 
|-id=475 bgcolor=#fefefe
| 438475 ||  || — || March 12, 2007 || Kitt Peak || Spacewatch || MAS || align=right data-sort-value="0.75" | 750 m || 
|-id=476 bgcolor=#fefefe
| 438476 ||  || — || January 27, 2007 || Kitt Peak || Spacewatch || — || align=right data-sort-value="0.73" | 730 m || 
|-id=477 bgcolor=#fefefe
| 438477 ||  || — || March 9, 2007 || Mount Lemmon || Mount Lemmon Survey || — || align=right data-sort-value="0.82" | 820 m || 
|-id=478 bgcolor=#fefefe
| 438478 ||  || — || February 23, 2007 || Mount Lemmon || Mount Lemmon Survey || — || align=right data-sort-value="0.70" | 700 m || 
|-id=479 bgcolor=#fefefe
| 438479 ||  || — || March 14, 2007 || Kitt Peak || Spacewatch || — || align=right data-sort-value="0.73" | 730 m || 
|-id=480 bgcolor=#fefefe
| 438480 ||  || — || March 14, 2007 || Kitt Peak || Spacewatch || — || align=right data-sort-value="0.96" | 960 m || 
|-id=481 bgcolor=#fefefe
| 438481 ||  || — || February 25, 2007 || Mount Lemmon || Mount Lemmon Survey || — || align=right data-sort-value="0.71" | 710 m || 
|-id=482 bgcolor=#fefefe
| 438482 ||  || — || March 15, 2007 || Kitt Peak || Spacewatch || — || align=right data-sort-value="0.67" | 670 m || 
|-id=483 bgcolor=#fefefe
| 438483 ||  || — || July 4, 2005 || Mount Lemmon || Mount Lemmon Survey || — || align=right data-sort-value="0.86" | 860 m || 
|-id=484 bgcolor=#fefefe
| 438484 ||  || — || March 14, 2007 || Kitt Peak || Spacewatch || NYS || align=right data-sort-value="0.54" | 540 m || 
|-id=485 bgcolor=#fefefe
| 438485 ||  || — || March 20, 2007 || Kitt Peak || Spacewatch || — || align=right data-sort-value="0.78" | 780 m || 
|-id=486 bgcolor=#fefefe
| 438486 ||  || — || March 20, 2007 || Mount Lemmon || Mount Lemmon Survey || NYS || align=right data-sort-value="0.62" | 620 m || 
|-id=487 bgcolor=#fefefe
| 438487 ||  || — || March 20, 2007 || Kitt Peak || Spacewatch || — || align=right data-sort-value="0.71" | 710 m || 
|-id=488 bgcolor=#fefefe
| 438488 ||  || — || April 11, 2007 || Kitt Peak || Spacewatch || — || align=right data-sort-value="0.76" | 760 m || 
|-id=489 bgcolor=#fefefe
| 438489 ||  || — || April 14, 2007 || Kitt Peak || Spacewatch || — || align=right data-sort-value="0.75" | 750 m || 
|-id=490 bgcolor=#fefefe
| 438490 ||  || — || March 13, 2003 || Kitt Peak || Spacewatch || NYS || align=right data-sort-value="0.59" | 590 m || 
|-id=491 bgcolor=#fefefe
| 438491 ||  || — || April 15, 2007 || Kitt Peak || Spacewatch || — || align=right data-sort-value="0.70" | 700 m || 
|-id=492 bgcolor=#fefefe
| 438492 ||  || — || April 24, 2007 || Kitt Peak || Spacewatch || MAS || align=right data-sort-value="0.96" | 960 m || 
|-id=493 bgcolor=#fefefe
| 438493 ||  || — || April 18, 2007 || Kitt Peak || Spacewatch || NYS || align=right data-sort-value="0.58" | 580 m || 
|-id=494 bgcolor=#E9E9E9
| 438494 ||  || — || July 15, 2007 || Siding Spring || SSS || EUN || align=right | 1.4 km || 
|-id=495 bgcolor=#E9E9E9
| 438495 ||  || — || July 28, 2007 || Pla D'Arguines || R. Ferrando || EUN || align=right | 1.1 km || 
|-id=496 bgcolor=#fefefe
| 438496 ||  || — || August 5, 2007 || Socorro || LINEAR || — || align=right data-sort-value="0.92" | 920 m || 
|-id=497 bgcolor=#E9E9E9
| 438497 ||  || — || August 9, 2007 || Socorro || LINEAR || — || align=right data-sort-value="0.94" | 940 m || 
|-id=498 bgcolor=#E9E9E9
| 438498 ||  || — || August 12, 2007 || Great Shefford || P. Birtwhistle || — || align=right | 1.3 km || 
|-id=499 bgcolor=#E9E9E9
| 438499 ||  || — || August 12, 2007 || Siding Spring || SSS || JUN || align=right | 1.2 km || 
|-id=500 bgcolor=#E9E9E9
| 438500 ||  || — || August 16, 2007 || Socorro || LINEAR || — || align=right | 1.2 km || 
|}

438501–438600 

|-bgcolor=#E9E9E9
| 438501 ||  || — || August 16, 2007 || San Marcello || Pistoia Mountains Obs. || — || align=right | 1.4 km || 
|-id=502 bgcolor=#E9E9E9
| 438502 ||  || — || August 23, 2007 || Kitt Peak || Spacewatch || — || align=right | 1.5 km || 
|-id=503 bgcolor=#E9E9E9
| 438503 ||  || — || August 16, 2007 || XuYi || PMO NEO || — || align=right | 1.1 km || 
|-id=504 bgcolor=#E9E9E9
| 438504 ||  || — || September 4, 2007 || Catalina || CSS || — || align=right | 4.5 km || 
|-id=505 bgcolor=#E9E9E9
| 438505 ||  || — || September 6, 2007 || Anderson Mesa || LONEOS || — || align=right | 1.3 km || 
|-id=506 bgcolor=#E9E9E9
| 438506 ||  || — || September 9, 2007 || Kitt Peak || Spacewatch || critical || align=right data-sort-value="0.86" | 860 m || 
|-id=507 bgcolor=#C2FFFF
| 438507 ||  || — || September 10, 2007 || Kitt Peak || Spacewatch || L4 || align=right | 7.7 km || 
|-id=508 bgcolor=#E9E9E9
| 438508 ||  || — || August 24, 2007 || Kitt Peak || Spacewatch || — || align=right | 1.3 km || 
|-id=509 bgcolor=#E9E9E9
| 438509 ||  || — || September 10, 2007 || Mount Lemmon || Mount Lemmon Survey || — || align=right | 1.9 km || 
|-id=510 bgcolor=#E9E9E9
| 438510 ||  || — || September 10, 2007 || Kitt Peak || Spacewatch || — || align=right | 1.3 km || 
|-id=511 bgcolor=#E9E9E9
| 438511 ||  || — || September 14, 2007 || Socorro || LINEAR || — || align=right | 1.4 km || 
|-id=512 bgcolor=#E9E9E9
| 438512 ||  || — || August 24, 2007 || Kitt Peak || Spacewatch || — || align=right | 2.0 km || 
|-id=513 bgcolor=#E9E9E9
| 438513 ||  || — || August 24, 2007 || Kitt Peak || Spacewatch || — || align=right | 1.1 km || 
|-id=514 bgcolor=#E9E9E9
| 438514 ||  || — || September 10, 2007 || Mount Lemmon || Mount Lemmon Survey || — || align=right | 1.5 km || 
|-id=515 bgcolor=#E9E9E9
| 438515 ||  || — || November 18, 2003 || Kitt Peak || Spacewatch || — || align=right | 1.1 km || 
|-id=516 bgcolor=#E9E9E9
| 438516 ||  || — || September 11, 2007 || Mount Lemmon || Mount Lemmon Survey || EUN || align=right | 1.3 km || 
|-id=517 bgcolor=#E9E9E9
| 438517 ||  || — || September 11, 2007 || Kitt Peak || Spacewatch || MIS || align=right | 2.7 km || 
|-id=518 bgcolor=#E9E9E9
| 438518 ||  || — || September 15, 2007 || Mount Lemmon || Mount Lemmon Survey || MIS || align=right | 2.5 km || 
|-id=519 bgcolor=#E9E9E9
| 438519 ||  || — || September 15, 2007 || Anderson Mesa || LONEOS || — || align=right | 2.9 km || 
|-id=520 bgcolor=#E9E9E9
| 438520 ||  || — || September 5, 2007 || Anderson Mesa || LONEOS || — || align=right | 3.2 km || 
|-id=521 bgcolor=#E9E9E9
| 438521 ||  || — || September 3, 2007 || Catalina || CSS || GEF || align=right | 1.3 km || 
|-id=522 bgcolor=#E9E9E9
| 438522 ||  || — || September 14, 2007 || Socorro || LINEAR || — || align=right | 1.7 km || 
|-id=523 bgcolor=#E9E9E9
| 438523 Figalli ||  ||  || September 30, 2007 || Farra d'Isonzo || Farra d'Isonzo || — || align=right | 1.2 km || 
|-id=524 bgcolor=#E9E9E9
| 438524 ||  || — || October 3, 2007 || Mayhill || A. Lowe || — || align=right | 1.6 km || 
|-id=525 bgcolor=#E9E9E9
| 438525 ||  || — || September 12, 2007 || Mount Lemmon || Mount Lemmon Survey || — || align=right data-sort-value="0.91" | 910 m || 
|-id=526 bgcolor=#E9E9E9
| 438526 ||  || — || October 6, 2007 || Kitt Peak || Spacewatch || — || align=right | 2.1 km || 
|-id=527 bgcolor=#E9E9E9
| 438527 ||  || — || October 7, 2007 || Mount Lemmon || Mount Lemmon Survey || — || align=right | 1.3 km || 
|-id=528 bgcolor=#E9E9E9
| 438528 ||  || — || October 4, 2007 || Kitt Peak || Spacewatch || critical || align=right | 1.3 km || 
|-id=529 bgcolor=#E9E9E9
| 438529 ||  || — || October 7, 2007 || Mount Lemmon || Mount Lemmon Survey || AGN || align=right | 1.5 km || 
|-id=530 bgcolor=#FA8072
| 438530 ||  || — || October 9, 2007 || Socorro || LINEAR || — || align=right | 1.3 km || 
|-id=531 bgcolor=#E9E9E9
| 438531 ||  || — || September 5, 2007 || Anderson Mesa || LONEOS || — || align=right | 1.4 km || 
|-id=532 bgcolor=#d6d6d6
| 438532 ||  || — || September 12, 2007 || Mount Lemmon || Mount Lemmon Survey || — || align=right | 2.7 km || 
|-id=533 bgcolor=#E9E9E9
| 438533 ||  || — || October 8, 2007 || Catalina || CSS || — || align=right | 2.8 km || 
|-id=534 bgcolor=#E9E9E9
| 438534 ||  || — || October 7, 2007 || Catalina || CSS || — || align=right | 2.6 km || 
|-id=535 bgcolor=#E9E9E9
| 438535 ||  || — || October 8, 2007 || Catalina || CSS || — || align=right | 2.3 km || 
|-id=536 bgcolor=#E9E9E9
| 438536 ||  || — || October 9, 2007 || Socorro || LINEAR || — || align=right data-sort-value="0.79" | 790 m || 
|-id=537 bgcolor=#E9E9E9
| 438537 ||  || — || October 11, 2007 || Socorro || LINEAR || (1547) || align=right | 1.9 km || 
|-id=538 bgcolor=#E9E9E9
| 438538 ||  || — || October 25, 2003 || Kitt Peak || Spacewatch || — || align=right data-sort-value="0.97" | 970 m || 
|-id=539 bgcolor=#E9E9E9
| 438539 ||  || — || October 5, 2007 || Kitt Peak || Spacewatch || — || align=right | 1.7 km || 
|-id=540 bgcolor=#E9E9E9
| 438540 ||  || — || September 20, 2003 || Kitt Peak || Spacewatch || (5) || align=right data-sort-value="0.63" | 630 m || 
|-id=541 bgcolor=#E9E9E9
| 438541 ||  || — || October 8, 2007 || Kitt Peak || Spacewatch || HOF || align=right | 2.5 km || 
|-id=542 bgcolor=#E9E9E9
| 438542 ||  || — || October 10, 2007 || Mount Lemmon || Mount Lemmon Survey || — || align=right data-sort-value="0.78" | 780 m || 
|-id=543 bgcolor=#E9E9E9
| 438543 ||  || — || October 7, 2007 || Kitt Peak || Spacewatch || — || align=right | 1.8 km || 
|-id=544 bgcolor=#E9E9E9
| 438544 ||  || — || March 10, 2005 || Mount Lemmon || Mount Lemmon Survey || — || align=right | 2.4 km || 
|-id=545 bgcolor=#E9E9E9
| 438545 ||  || — || October 8, 2007 || Mount Lemmon || Mount Lemmon Survey || critical || align=right | 1.0 km || 
|-id=546 bgcolor=#fefefe
| 438546 ||  || — || October 11, 2007 || Mount Lemmon || Mount Lemmon Survey || H || align=right data-sort-value="0.88" | 880 m || 
|-id=547 bgcolor=#E9E9E9
| 438547 ||  || — || October 11, 2007 || Kitt Peak || Spacewatch || — || align=right | 1.5 km || 
|-id=548 bgcolor=#E9E9E9
| 438548 ||  || — || October 8, 2007 || Kitt Peak || Spacewatch || — || align=right | 2.0 km || 
|-id=549 bgcolor=#E9E9E9
| 438549 ||  || — || October 8, 2007 || Catalina || CSS || (5) || align=right data-sort-value="0.78" | 780 m || 
|-id=550 bgcolor=#E9E9E9
| 438550 ||  || — || October 10, 2007 || Anderson Mesa || LONEOS || — || align=right data-sort-value="0.95" | 950 m || 
|-id=551 bgcolor=#d6d6d6
| 438551 ||  || — || September 14, 2007 || Mount Lemmon || Mount Lemmon Survey || — || align=right | 2.3 km || 
|-id=552 bgcolor=#E9E9E9
| 438552 ||  || — || October 9, 2007 || Kitt Peak || Spacewatch || — || align=right | 1.3 km || 
|-id=553 bgcolor=#E9E9E9
| 438553 ||  || — || October 11, 2007 || Catalina || CSS || — || align=right | 2.1 km || 
|-id=554 bgcolor=#E9E9E9
| 438554 ||  || — || September 11, 2007 || Kitt Peak || Spacewatch || critical || align=right data-sort-value="0.65" | 650 m || 
|-id=555 bgcolor=#E9E9E9
| 438555 ||  || — || August 22, 2007 || Socorro || LINEAR || — || align=right | 1.7 km || 
|-id=556 bgcolor=#E9E9E9
| 438556 ||  || — || October 12, 2007 || Kitt Peak || Spacewatch || — || align=right | 1.2 km || 
|-id=557 bgcolor=#E9E9E9
| 438557 ||  || — || October 11, 2007 || Kitt Peak || Spacewatch || WIT || align=right | 1.0 km || 
|-id=558 bgcolor=#E9E9E9
| 438558 ||  || — || October 11, 2007 || Kitt Peak || Spacewatch || — || align=right | 1.4 km || 
|-id=559 bgcolor=#E9E9E9
| 438559 ||  || — || October 12, 2007 || Kitt Peak || Spacewatch || (5) || align=right data-sort-value="0.82" | 820 m || 
|-id=560 bgcolor=#d6d6d6
| 438560 ||  || — || October 10, 2007 || Mount Lemmon || Mount Lemmon Survey || KOR || align=right | 1.1 km || 
|-id=561 bgcolor=#E9E9E9
| 438561 ||  || — || October 14, 2007 || Kitt Peak || Spacewatch || — || align=right | 1.1 km || 
|-id=562 bgcolor=#E9E9E9
| 438562 ||  || — || September 12, 2007 || Catalina || CSS || — || align=right | 1.8 km || 
|-id=563 bgcolor=#E9E9E9
| 438563 ||  || — || October 9, 2007 || Catalina || CSS || MAR || align=right | 1.1 km || 
|-id=564 bgcolor=#E9E9E9
| 438564 ||  || — || September 14, 2007 || Mount Lemmon || Mount Lemmon Survey || — || align=right | 1.2 km || 
|-id=565 bgcolor=#E9E9E9
| 438565 ||  || — || October 12, 2007 || Anderson Mesa || LONEOS || — || align=right data-sort-value="0.84" | 840 m || 
|-id=566 bgcolor=#E9E9E9
| 438566 ||  || — || September 11, 2007 || XuYi || PMO NEO || (5) || align=right data-sort-value="0.70" | 700 m || 
|-id=567 bgcolor=#E9E9E9
| 438567 ||  || — || October 8, 2007 || Catalina || CSS || EUNcritical || align=right | 1.1 km || 
|-id=568 bgcolor=#E9E9E9
| 438568 ||  || — || October 8, 2007 || Kitt Peak || Spacewatch || — || align=right | 1.1 km || 
|-id=569 bgcolor=#E9E9E9
| 438569 ||  || — || October 12, 2007 || Kitt Peak || Spacewatch || — || align=right | 1.4 km || 
|-id=570 bgcolor=#E9E9E9
| 438570 ||  || — || October 16, 2007 || Andrushivka || Andrushivka Obs. || — || align=right | 2.3 km || 
|-id=571 bgcolor=#E9E9E9
| 438571 ||  || — || October 21, 2007 || Prairie Grass || J. Mahony || — || align=right | 1.7 km || 
|-id=572 bgcolor=#FA8072
| 438572 ||  || — || October 23, 2007 || Sierra Stars || F. Tozzi || — || align=right | 1.4 km || 
|-id=573 bgcolor=#d6d6d6
| 438573 ||  || — || October 16, 2007 || Catalina || CSS || — || align=right | 3.3 km || 
|-id=574 bgcolor=#E9E9E9
| 438574 ||  || — || October 22, 2007 || Socorro || LINEAR || — || align=right | 1.9 km || 
|-id=575 bgcolor=#E9E9E9
| 438575 ||  || — || October 16, 2007 || Kitt Peak || Spacewatch || — || align=right data-sort-value="0.73" | 730 m || 
|-id=576 bgcolor=#E9E9E9
| 438576 ||  || — || October 16, 2007 || Mount Lemmon || Mount Lemmon Survey || — || align=right | 1.3 km || 
|-id=577 bgcolor=#E9E9E9
| 438577 ||  || — || October 30, 2007 || Mount Lemmon || Mount Lemmon Survey || — || align=right | 2.0 km || 
|-id=578 bgcolor=#E9E9E9
| 438578 ||  || — || October 30, 2007 || Catalina || CSS || — || align=right data-sort-value="0.83" | 830 m || 
|-id=579 bgcolor=#E9E9E9
| 438579 ||  || — || October 8, 2007 || Kitt Peak || Spacewatch || — || align=right | 2.9 km || 
|-id=580 bgcolor=#E9E9E9
| 438580 ||  || — || September 9, 2007 || Mount Lemmon || Mount Lemmon Survey || PAD || align=right | 1.4 km || 
|-id=581 bgcolor=#E9E9E9
| 438581 ||  || — || October 30, 2007 || Kitt Peak || Spacewatch || — || align=right | 2.2 km || 
|-id=582 bgcolor=#E9E9E9
| 438582 ||  || — || September 9, 2007 || Mount Lemmon || Mount Lemmon Survey || MIS || align=right | 2.0 km || 
|-id=583 bgcolor=#E9E9E9
| 438583 ||  || — || September 10, 2007 || Mount Lemmon || Mount Lemmon Survey || — || align=right | 1.3 km || 
|-id=584 bgcolor=#E9E9E9
| 438584 ||  || — || October 30, 2007 || Mount Lemmon || Mount Lemmon Survey || AST || align=right | 1.5 km || 
|-id=585 bgcolor=#E9E9E9
| 438585 ||  || — || October 10, 2007 || Mount Lemmon || Mount Lemmon Survey || ADE || align=right | 1.6 km || 
|-id=586 bgcolor=#E9E9E9
| 438586 ||  || — || October 12, 2007 || Kitt Peak || Spacewatch || — || align=right | 2.2 km || 
|-id=587 bgcolor=#E9E9E9
| 438587 ||  || — || November 2, 2007 || Catalina || CSS || — || align=right | 1.2 km || 
|-id=588 bgcolor=#E9E9E9
| 438588 ||  || — || November 2, 2007 || Kitt Peak || Spacewatch || — || align=right | 2.0 km || 
|-id=589 bgcolor=#E9E9E9
| 438589 ||  || — || November 3, 2007 || Kitt Peak || Spacewatch || — || align=right | 1.7 km || 
|-id=590 bgcolor=#E9E9E9
| 438590 ||  || — || October 16, 2007 || Kitt Peak || Spacewatch || critical || align=right | 1.1 km || 
|-id=591 bgcolor=#E9E9E9
| 438591 ||  || — || November 1, 2007 || Kitt Peak || Spacewatch || — || align=right | 2.7 km || 
|-id=592 bgcolor=#E9E9E9
| 438592 ||  || — || November 1, 2007 || Kitt Peak || Spacewatch || WIT || align=right data-sort-value="0.89" | 890 m || 
|-id=593 bgcolor=#E9E9E9
| 438593 ||  || — || November 1, 2007 || Kitt Peak || Spacewatch || PAD || align=right | 1.6 km || 
|-id=594 bgcolor=#E9E9E9
| 438594 ||  || — || November 1, 2007 || Kitt Peak || Spacewatch || — || align=right | 1.2 km || 
|-id=595 bgcolor=#d6d6d6
| 438595 ||  || — || October 20, 2007 || Mount Lemmon || Mount Lemmon Survey || — || align=right | 2.6 km || 
|-id=596 bgcolor=#E9E9E9
| 438596 ||  || — || November 2, 2007 || Mount Lemmon || Mount Lemmon Survey || — || align=right | 1.9 km || 
|-id=597 bgcolor=#d6d6d6
| 438597 ||  || — || September 15, 2007 || Mount Lemmon || Mount Lemmon Survey || KOR || align=right | 1.3 km || 
|-id=598 bgcolor=#E9E9E9
| 438598 ||  || — || November 3, 2007 || Socorro || LINEAR || ADE || align=right | 3.4 km || 
|-id=599 bgcolor=#E9E9E9
| 438599 ||  || — || November 1, 2007 || Kitt Peak || Spacewatch || PAD || align=right | 1.5 km || 
|-id=600 bgcolor=#E9E9E9
| 438600 ||  || — || April 9, 2005 || Mount Lemmon || Mount Lemmon Survey || — || align=right | 2.2 km || 
|}

438601–438700 

|-bgcolor=#d6d6d6
| 438601 ||  || — || November 2, 2007 || Kitt Peak || Spacewatch || KOR || align=right | 1.4 km || 
|-id=602 bgcolor=#E9E9E9
| 438602 ||  || — || November 3, 2007 || Kitt Peak || Spacewatch || — || align=right | 2.3 km || 
|-id=603 bgcolor=#d6d6d6
| 438603 ||  || — || November 2, 2007 || Mount Lemmon || Mount Lemmon Survey || — || align=right | 2.9 km || 
|-id=604 bgcolor=#E9E9E9
| 438604 ||  || — || October 31, 2007 || Mount Lemmon || Mount Lemmon Survey || — || align=right | 1.4 km || 
|-id=605 bgcolor=#E9E9E9
| 438605 ||  || — || November 5, 2007 || Kitt Peak || Spacewatch || — || align=right | 2.2 km || 
|-id=606 bgcolor=#E9E9E9
| 438606 ||  || — || November 5, 2007 || XuYi || PMO NEO || — || align=right | 1.4 km || 
|-id=607 bgcolor=#E9E9E9
| 438607 ||  || — || June 20, 2006 || Kitt Peak || Spacewatch || — || align=right | 2.4 km || 
|-id=608 bgcolor=#d6d6d6
| 438608 ||  || — || November 4, 2007 || Mount Lemmon || Mount Lemmon Survey || — || align=right | 2.9 km || 
|-id=609 bgcolor=#E9E9E9
| 438609 ||  || — || November 14, 2007 || Kitt Peak || Spacewatch || — || align=right | 2.2 km || 
|-id=610 bgcolor=#E9E9E9
| 438610 ||  || — || October 11, 2007 || Catalina || CSS || — || align=right | 2.2 km || 
|-id=611 bgcolor=#E9E9E9
| 438611 ||  || — || November 13, 2007 || Kitt Peak || Spacewatch || AGN || align=right | 1.2 km || 
|-id=612 bgcolor=#E9E9E9
| 438612 ||  || — || November 2, 2007 || Socorro || LINEAR || — || align=right | 2.4 km || 
|-id=613 bgcolor=#E9E9E9
| 438613 ||  || — || November 6, 2007 || Kitt Peak || Spacewatch || — || align=right | 2.1 km || 
|-id=614 bgcolor=#E9E9E9
| 438614 ||  || — || November 10, 2007 || XuYi || PMO NEO || 526 || align=right | 2.6 km || 
|-id=615 bgcolor=#d6d6d6
| 438615 ||  || — || November 18, 2007 || Kitt Peak || Spacewatch || — || align=right | 2.3 km || 
|-id=616 bgcolor=#d6d6d6
| 438616 ||  || — || November 5, 2007 || Mount Lemmon || Mount Lemmon Survey || — || align=right | 2.8 km || 
|-id=617 bgcolor=#E9E9E9
| 438617 ||  || — || December 5, 2007 || Kitt Peak || Spacewatch || — || align=right | 2.9 km || 
|-id=618 bgcolor=#E9E9E9
| 438618 ||  || — || September 20, 2007 || Catalina || CSS || — || align=right | 1.9 km || 
|-id=619 bgcolor=#d6d6d6
| 438619 ||  || — || December 14, 2007 || Mount Lemmon || Mount Lemmon Survey || — || align=right | 4.1 km || 
|-id=620 bgcolor=#E9E9E9
| 438620 ||  || — || December 14, 2007 || Mount Lemmon || Mount Lemmon Survey || — || align=right | 2.5 km || 
|-id=621 bgcolor=#d6d6d6
| 438621 ||  || — || December 4, 2007 || Mount Lemmon || Mount Lemmon Survey || — || align=right | 2.7 km || 
|-id=622 bgcolor=#d6d6d6
| 438622 ||  || — || December 4, 2007 || Kitt Peak || Spacewatch || — || align=right | 3.0 km || 
|-id=623 bgcolor=#d6d6d6
| 438623 ||  || — || December 3, 2007 || Kitt Peak || Spacewatch || — || align=right | 3.1 km || 
|-id=624 bgcolor=#d6d6d6
| 438624 ||  || — || December 17, 2007 || Mount Lemmon || Mount Lemmon Survey || EOS || align=right | 2.6 km || 
|-id=625 bgcolor=#d6d6d6
| 438625 ||  || — || December 18, 2007 || Kitt Peak || Spacewatch || — || align=right | 4.1 km || 
|-id=626 bgcolor=#d6d6d6
| 438626 ||  || — || December 31, 2007 || Kitt Peak || Spacewatch || — || align=right | 3.5 km || 
|-id=627 bgcolor=#d6d6d6
| 438627 ||  || — || December 18, 2007 || Kitt Peak || Spacewatch || — || align=right | 2.7 km || 
|-id=628 bgcolor=#d6d6d6
| 438628 ||  || — || November 7, 2007 || Mount Lemmon || Mount Lemmon Survey || EOS || align=right | 2.2 km || 
|-id=629 bgcolor=#d6d6d6
| 438629 ||  || — || January 10, 2008 || Mount Lemmon || Mount Lemmon Survey || — || align=right | 2.4 km || 
|-id=630 bgcolor=#fefefe
| 438630 ||  || — || January 14, 2008 || Kitt Peak || Spacewatch || — || align=right data-sort-value="0.87" | 870 m || 
|-id=631 bgcolor=#d6d6d6
| 438631 ||  || — || January 13, 2008 || Kitt Peak || Spacewatch || — || align=right | 4.3 km || 
|-id=632 bgcolor=#d6d6d6
| 438632 ||  || — || December 31, 2007 || Mount Lemmon || Mount Lemmon Survey || — || align=right | 2.9 km || 
|-id=633 bgcolor=#E9E9E9
| 438633 ||  || — || October 18, 2007 || Catalina || CSS || — || align=right | 1.3 km || 
|-id=634 bgcolor=#d6d6d6
| 438634 ||  || — || January 13, 2008 || Kitt Peak || Spacewatch || — || align=right | 2.7 km || 
|-id=635 bgcolor=#d6d6d6
| 438635 ||  || — || January 16, 2008 || Kitt Peak || Spacewatch || — || align=right | 3.5 km || 
|-id=636 bgcolor=#d6d6d6
| 438636 ||  || — || November 21, 2007 || Catalina || CSS || — || align=right | 4.5 km || 
|-id=637 bgcolor=#d6d6d6
| 438637 ||  || — || February 3, 2008 || Kitt Peak || Spacewatch || — || align=right | 3.2 km || 
|-id=638 bgcolor=#d6d6d6
| 438638 ||  || — || February 2, 2008 || Kitt Peak || Spacewatch || — || align=right | 2.4 km || 
|-id=639 bgcolor=#d6d6d6
| 438639 ||  || — || February 2, 2008 || Kitt Peak || Spacewatch || — || align=right | 3.2 km || 
|-id=640 bgcolor=#d6d6d6
| 438640 ||  || — || February 2, 2008 || Kitt Peak || Spacewatch || — || align=right | 2.1 km || 
|-id=641 bgcolor=#d6d6d6
| 438641 ||  || — || January 18, 2008 || Kitt Peak || Spacewatch || HYG || align=right | 2.4 km || 
|-id=642 bgcolor=#fefefe
| 438642 ||  || — || February 7, 2008 || Kitt Peak || Spacewatch || — || align=right data-sort-value="0.78" | 780 m || 
|-id=643 bgcolor=#d6d6d6
| 438643 ||  || — || January 1, 2008 || Kitt Peak || Spacewatch || — || align=right | 3.1 km || 
|-id=644 bgcolor=#d6d6d6
| 438644 ||  || — || February 10, 2008 || Kitt Peak || Spacewatch || Tj (2.99) || align=right | 5.2 km || 
|-id=645 bgcolor=#d6d6d6
| 438645 ||  || — || January 20, 2008 || Mount Lemmon || Mount Lemmon Survey || EOS || align=right | 1.9 km || 
|-id=646 bgcolor=#fefefe
| 438646 ||  || — || February 8, 2008 || Mount Lemmon || Mount Lemmon Survey || — || align=right data-sort-value="0.53" | 530 m || 
|-id=647 bgcolor=#fefefe
| 438647 ||  || — || August 28, 2006 || Kitt Peak || Spacewatch || — || align=right data-sort-value="0.60" | 600 m || 
|-id=648 bgcolor=#d6d6d6
| 438648 ||  || — || February 9, 2008 || Kitt Peak || Spacewatch || — || align=right | 2.1 km || 
|-id=649 bgcolor=#d6d6d6
| 438649 ||  || — || January 10, 2008 || Mount Lemmon || Mount Lemmon Survey || — || align=right | 3.5 km || 
|-id=650 bgcolor=#E9E9E9
| 438650 ||  || — || February 11, 2008 || Mount Lemmon || Mount Lemmon Survey || — || align=right | 2.2 km || 
|-id=651 bgcolor=#d6d6d6
| 438651 ||  || — || January 11, 2008 || Mount Lemmon || Mount Lemmon Survey || — || align=right | 3.6 km || 
|-id=652 bgcolor=#d6d6d6
| 438652 ||  || — || February 11, 2008 || Mount Lemmon || Mount Lemmon Survey || THB || align=right | 2.5 km || 
|-id=653 bgcolor=#d6d6d6
| 438653 ||  || — || February 8, 2008 || Kitt Peak || Spacewatch || HYG || align=right | 2.4 km || 
|-id=654 bgcolor=#fefefe
| 438654 ||  || — || February 13, 2008 || Kitt Peak || Spacewatch || — || align=right data-sort-value="0.54" | 540 m || 
|-id=655 bgcolor=#d6d6d6
| 438655 ||  || — || February 29, 2008 || Mount Lemmon || Mount Lemmon Survey || — || align=right | 3.1 km || 
|-id=656 bgcolor=#E9E9E9
| 438656 ||  || — || July 4, 2005 || Mount Lemmon || Mount Lemmon Survey || AGN || align=right | 1.5 km || 
|-id=657 bgcolor=#fefefe
| 438657 ||  || — || February 28, 2008 || Mount Lemmon || Mount Lemmon Survey || — || align=right data-sort-value="0.61" | 610 m || 
|-id=658 bgcolor=#d6d6d6
| 438658 ||  || — || February 28, 2008 || Mount Lemmon || Mount Lemmon Survey || (1118) || align=right | 3.5 km || 
|-id=659 bgcolor=#d6d6d6
| 438659 ||  || — || February 28, 2008 || Kitt Peak || Spacewatch || — || align=right | 3.1 km || 
|-id=660 bgcolor=#fefefe
| 438660 ||  || — || February 28, 2008 || Kitt Peak || Spacewatch || — || align=right data-sort-value="0.68" | 680 m || 
|-id=661 bgcolor=#FFC2E0
| 438661 ||  || — || March 5, 2008 || Siding Spring || SSS || APOPHA || align=right data-sort-value="0.49" | 490 m || 
|-id=662 bgcolor=#d6d6d6
| 438662 ||  || — || February 18, 2008 || Mount Lemmon || Mount Lemmon Survey || — || align=right | 2.8 km || 
|-id=663 bgcolor=#d6d6d6
| 438663 ||  || — || March 4, 2008 || Kitt Peak || Spacewatch || — || align=right | 3.5 km || 
|-id=664 bgcolor=#d6d6d6
| 438664 ||  || — || March 9, 2008 || Mount Lemmon || Mount Lemmon Survey || — || align=right | 2.8 km || 
|-id=665 bgcolor=#fefefe
| 438665 ||  || — || March 10, 2008 || Kitt Peak || Spacewatch || — || align=right data-sort-value="0.58" | 580 m || 
|-id=666 bgcolor=#d6d6d6
| 438666 ||  || — || March 10, 2008 || Catalina || CSS || — || align=right | 3.1 km || 
|-id=667 bgcolor=#d6d6d6
| 438667 ||  || — || March 15, 2008 || Mount Lemmon || Mount Lemmon Survey || — || align=right | 3.0 km || 
|-id=668 bgcolor=#fefefe
| 438668 ||  || — || March 10, 2008 || Kitt Peak || Spacewatch || — || align=right data-sort-value="0.64" | 640 m || 
|-id=669 bgcolor=#fefefe
| 438669 ||  || — || March 27, 2008 || Kitt Peak || Spacewatch || — || align=right data-sort-value="0.96" | 960 m || 
|-id=670 bgcolor=#fefefe
| 438670 ||  || — || March 5, 2008 || Mount Lemmon || Mount Lemmon Survey || — || align=right data-sort-value="0.81" | 810 m || 
|-id=671 bgcolor=#fefefe
| 438671 ||  || — || September 25, 1995 || Kitt Peak || Spacewatch || critical || align=right data-sort-value="0.52" | 520 m || 
|-id=672 bgcolor=#fefefe
| 438672 ||  || — || March 29, 2008 || Kitt Peak || Spacewatch || — || align=right data-sort-value="0.86" | 860 m || 
|-id=673 bgcolor=#d6d6d6
| 438673 ||  || — || April 3, 2008 || Mount Lemmon || Mount Lemmon Survey || — || align=right | 2.8 km || 
|-id=674 bgcolor=#fefefe
| 438674 ||  || — || April 3, 2008 || Kitt Peak || Spacewatch || — || align=right | 2.5 km || 
|-id=675 bgcolor=#d6d6d6
| 438675 ||  || — || March 15, 2008 || Kitt Peak || Spacewatch || 7:4 || align=right | 3.0 km || 
|-id=676 bgcolor=#fefefe
| 438676 ||  || — || April 8, 2008 || Kitt Peak || Spacewatch || — || align=right data-sort-value="0.75" | 750 m || 
|-id=677 bgcolor=#fefefe
| 438677 ||  || — || April 6, 2008 || Kitt Peak || Spacewatch || — || align=right data-sort-value="0.65" | 650 m || 
|-id=678 bgcolor=#fefefe
| 438678 ||  || — || April 3, 2008 || Kitt Peak || Spacewatch || — || align=right data-sort-value="0.77" | 770 m || 
|-id=679 bgcolor=#fefefe
| 438679 ||  || — || April 11, 2008 || Kitt Peak || Spacewatch || — || align=right data-sort-value="0.64" | 640 m || 
|-id=680 bgcolor=#fefefe
| 438680 ||  || — || April 7, 2008 || Kitt Peak || Spacewatch || — || align=right data-sort-value="0.65" | 650 m || 
|-id=681 bgcolor=#d6d6d6
| 438681 ||  || — || April 8, 2008 || Kitt Peak || Spacewatch || EOS || align=right | 2.1 km || 
|-id=682 bgcolor=#C2FFFF
| 438682 ||  || — || April 26, 2008 || Kitt Peak || Spacewatch || L5 || align=right | 11 km || 
|-id=683 bgcolor=#fefefe
| 438683 ||  || — || August 29, 2005 || Kitt Peak || Spacewatch || — || align=right data-sort-value="0.48" | 480 m || 
|-id=684 bgcolor=#fefefe
| 438684 ||  || — || May 8, 1994 || Kitt Peak || Spacewatch || — || align=right data-sort-value="0.71" | 710 m || 
|-id=685 bgcolor=#fefefe
| 438685 ||  || — || April 6, 2008 || Mount Lemmon || Mount Lemmon Survey || — || align=right data-sort-value="0.93" | 930 m || 
|-id=686 bgcolor=#fefefe
| 438686 ||  || — || May 6, 2008 || Mount Lemmon || Mount Lemmon Survey || (2076) || align=right data-sort-value="0.73" | 730 m || 
|-id=687 bgcolor=#d6d6d6
| 438687 ||  || — || May 13, 2008 || Mount Lemmon || Mount Lemmon Survey || EOS || align=right | 2.4 km || 
|-id=688 bgcolor=#fefefe
| 438688 ||  || — || June 6, 2008 || Kitt Peak || Spacewatch || — || align=right data-sort-value="0.86" | 860 m || 
|-id=689 bgcolor=#fefefe
| 438689 ||  || — || May 15, 2008 || Mount Lemmon || Mount Lemmon Survey || — || align=right data-sort-value="0.76" | 760 m || 
|-id=690 bgcolor=#fefefe
| 438690 ||  || — || July 30, 2008 || Kitt Peak || Spacewatch || — || align=right | 1.1 km || 
|-id=691 bgcolor=#fefefe
| 438691 ||  || — || July 30, 2008 || Mount Lemmon || Mount Lemmon Survey || MAS || align=right data-sort-value="0.76" | 760 m || 
|-id=692 bgcolor=#fefefe
| 438692 ||  || — || August 9, 2008 || Dauban || F. Kugel || — || align=right | 2.6 km || 
|-id=693 bgcolor=#FA8072
| 438693 ||  || — || July 26, 2008 || Siding Spring || SSS || — || align=right | 1.2 km || 
|-id=694 bgcolor=#d6d6d6
| 438694 ||  || — || August 7, 2008 || Kitt Peak || Spacewatch || SHU3:2 || align=right | 5.8 km || 
|-id=695 bgcolor=#fefefe
| 438695 ||  || — || July 29, 2008 || Kitt Peak || Spacewatch || MAS || align=right data-sort-value="0.72" | 720 m || 
|-id=696 bgcolor=#d6d6d6
| 438696 ||  || — || August 29, 2008 || La Sagra || OAM Obs. || 3:2 || align=right | 4.0 km || 
|-id=697 bgcolor=#fefefe
| 438697 ||  || — || November 12, 2005 || Kitt Peak || Spacewatch || — || align=right data-sort-value="0.78" | 780 m || 
|-id=698 bgcolor=#fefefe
| 438698 ||  || — || August 21, 2008 || Kitt Peak || Spacewatch || critical || align=right data-sort-value="0.71" | 710 m || 
|-id=699 bgcolor=#fefefe
| 438699 ||  || — || September 2, 2008 || Kitt Peak || Spacewatch || MAS || align=right data-sort-value="0.75" | 750 m || 
|-id=700 bgcolor=#fefefe
| 438700 ||  || — || July 29, 2008 || Mount Lemmon || Mount Lemmon Survey || V || align=right data-sort-value="0.49" | 490 m || 
|}

438701–438800 

|-bgcolor=#fefefe
| 438701 ||  || — || September 3, 2008 || Kitt Peak || Spacewatch || — || align=right data-sort-value="0.89" | 890 m || 
|-id=702 bgcolor=#fefefe
| 438702 ||  || — || September 4, 2008 || Kitt Peak || Spacewatch || — || align=right data-sort-value="0.90" | 900 m || 
|-id=703 bgcolor=#fefefe
| 438703 ||  || — || September 5, 2008 || Kitt Peak || Spacewatch || — || align=right data-sort-value="0.73" | 730 m || 
|-id=704 bgcolor=#E9E9E9
| 438704 ||  || — || September 3, 2008 || Kitt Peak || Spacewatch || — || align=right | 1.1 km || 
|-id=705 bgcolor=#E9E9E9
| 438705 ||  || — || September 4, 2008 || Kitt Peak || Spacewatch || — || align=right | 2.2 km || 
|-id=706 bgcolor=#fefefe
| 438706 ||  || — || September 6, 2008 || Mount Lemmon || Mount Lemmon Survey || — || align=right data-sort-value="0.89" | 890 m || 
|-id=707 bgcolor=#fefefe
| 438707 ||  || — || September 4, 2008 || Socorro || LINEAR || — || align=right data-sort-value="0.82" | 820 m || 
|-id=708 bgcolor=#fefefe
| 438708 ||  || — || September 4, 2008 || Kitt Peak || Spacewatch || (2076) || align=right data-sort-value="0.85" | 850 m || 
|-id=709 bgcolor=#fefefe
| 438709 ||  || — || September 8, 2008 || Kitt Peak || Spacewatch || — || align=right data-sort-value="0.75" | 750 m || 
|-id=710 bgcolor=#fefefe
| 438710 ||  || — || September 5, 2008 || Kitt Peak || Spacewatch || — || align=right data-sort-value="0.77" | 770 m || 
|-id=711 bgcolor=#fefefe
| 438711 ||  || — || September 22, 2008 || Goodricke-Pigott || R. A. Tucker || NYS || align=right data-sort-value="0.69" | 690 m || 
|-id=712 bgcolor=#fefefe
| 438712 ||  || — || September 20, 2008 || Kitt Peak || Spacewatch || — || align=right data-sort-value="0.98" | 980 m || 
|-id=713 bgcolor=#E9E9E9
| 438713 ||  || — || September 20, 2008 || Kitt Peak || Spacewatch || — || align=right | 1.0 km || 
|-id=714 bgcolor=#fefefe
| 438714 ||  || — || September 27, 2008 || Sierra Stars || F. Tozzi || — || align=right data-sort-value="0.79" | 790 m || 
|-id=715 bgcolor=#fefefe
| 438715 ||  || — || September 21, 2008 || Kitt Peak || Spacewatch || — || align=right data-sort-value="0.88" | 880 m || 
|-id=716 bgcolor=#fefefe
| 438716 ||  || — || August 22, 2004 || Kitt Peak || Spacewatch || — || align=right data-sort-value="0.75" | 750 m || 
|-id=717 bgcolor=#fefefe
| 438717 ||  || — || September 21, 2008 || Kitt Peak || Spacewatch || V || align=right data-sort-value="0.64" | 640 m || 
|-id=718 bgcolor=#E9E9E9
| 438718 ||  || — || September 21, 2008 || Kitt Peak || Spacewatch || — || align=right data-sort-value="0.96" | 960 m || 
|-id=719 bgcolor=#E9E9E9
| 438719 ||  || — || September 21, 2008 || Kitt Peak || Spacewatch || — || align=right | 1.8 km || 
|-id=720 bgcolor=#fefefe
| 438720 ||  || — || September 23, 2008 || Kitt Peak || Spacewatch || H || align=right data-sort-value="0.76" | 760 m || 
|-id=721 bgcolor=#E9E9E9
| 438721 ||  || — || September 28, 2008 || Mount Lemmon || Mount Lemmon Survey || — || align=right | 1.4 km || 
|-id=722 bgcolor=#E9E9E9
| 438722 ||  || — || September 30, 2008 || Mount Lemmon || Mount Lemmon Survey || — || align=right | 1.3 km || 
|-id=723 bgcolor=#E9E9E9
| 438723 ||  || — || September 27, 2008 || Bergisch Gladbach || W. Bickel || — || align=right | 2.7 km || 
|-id=724 bgcolor=#fefefe
| 438724 ||  || — || September 29, 2008 || Kitt Peak || Spacewatch || — || align=right data-sort-value="0.81" | 810 m || 
|-id=725 bgcolor=#E9E9E9
| 438725 ||  || — || September 29, 2008 || Kitt Peak || Spacewatch || — || align=right | 3.0 km || 
|-id=726 bgcolor=#E9E9E9
| 438726 ||  || — || September 20, 2008 || Mount Lemmon || Mount Lemmon Survey || — || align=right | 1.5 km || 
|-id=727 bgcolor=#fefefe
| 438727 ||  || — || September 23, 2008 || Kitt Peak || Spacewatch || — || align=right data-sort-value="0.92" | 920 m || 
|-id=728 bgcolor=#fefefe
| 438728 ||  || — || September 20, 2008 || Kitt Peak || Spacewatch || MAS || align=right data-sort-value="0.70" | 700 m || 
|-id=729 bgcolor=#E9E9E9
| 438729 ||  || — || September 26, 2008 || Kitt Peak || Spacewatch || — || align=right | 1.0 km || 
|-id=730 bgcolor=#E9E9E9
| 438730 ||  || — || September 27, 2008 || Mount Lemmon || Mount Lemmon Survey || RAF || align=right data-sort-value="0.85" | 850 m || 
|-id=731 bgcolor=#fefefe
| 438731 ||  || — || September 29, 2008 || Socorro || LINEAR || — || align=right data-sort-value="0.89" | 890 m || 
|-id=732 bgcolor=#E9E9E9
| 438732 ||  || — || September 24, 2008 || Kitt Peak || Spacewatch || — || align=right | 1.9 km || 
|-id=733 bgcolor=#fefefe
| 438733 ||  || — || October 3, 2008 || La Sagra || OAM Obs. || — || align=right data-sort-value="0.82" | 820 m || 
|-id=734 bgcolor=#fefefe
| 438734 ||  || — || October 1, 2008 || Mount Lemmon || Mount Lemmon Survey || NYS || align=right data-sort-value="0.63" | 630 m || 
|-id=735 bgcolor=#E9E9E9
| 438735 ||  || — || October 1, 2008 || Mount Lemmon || Mount Lemmon Survey || — || align=right | 1.7 km || 
|-id=736 bgcolor=#fefefe
| 438736 ||  || — || September 23, 2008 || Catalina || CSS || — || align=right | 1.7 km || 
|-id=737 bgcolor=#fefefe
| 438737 ||  || — || October 2, 2008 || Mount Lemmon || Mount Lemmon Survey || — || align=right data-sort-value="0.90" | 900 m || 
|-id=738 bgcolor=#fefefe
| 438738 ||  || — || October 3, 2008 || Kitt Peak || Spacewatch || — || align=right data-sort-value="0.90" | 900 m || 
|-id=739 bgcolor=#fefefe
| 438739 ||  || — || September 27, 2008 || Mount Lemmon || Mount Lemmon Survey || — || align=right data-sort-value="0.88" | 880 m || 
|-id=740 bgcolor=#fefefe
| 438740 ||  || — || October 5, 2008 || La Sagra || OAM Obs. || — || align=right data-sort-value="0.80" | 800 m || 
|-id=741 bgcolor=#C2FFFF
| 438741 ||  || — || October 6, 2008 || Mount Lemmon || Mount Lemmon Survey || L4 || align=right | 7.4 km || 
|-id=742 bgcolor=#fefefe
| 438742 ||  || — || October 8, 2008 || Catalina || CSS || — || align=right data-sort-value="0.83" | 830 m || 
|-id=743 bgcolor=#fefefe
| 438743 ||  || — || October 9, 2008 || Kitt Peak || Spacewatch || — || align=right data-sort-value="0.87" | 870 m || 
|-id=744 bgcolor=#fefefe
| 438744 ||  || — || October 1, 2008 || Kitt Peak || Spacewatch || H || align=right data-sort-value="0.59" | 590 m || 
|-id=745 bgcolor=#E9E9E9
| 438745 ||  || — || October 8, 2008 || Kitt Peak || Spacewatch || — || align=right | 1.9 km || 
|-id=746 bgcolor=#E9E9E9
| 438746 ||  || — || October 9, 2008 || Mount Lemmon || Mount Lemmon Survey || — || align=right | 3.2 km || 
|-id=747 bgcolor=#C2FFFF
| 438747 ||  || — || October 8, 2008 || Mount Lemmon || Mount Lemmon Survey || L4 || align=right | 7.2 km || 
|-id=748 bgcolor=#fefefe
| 438748 ||  || — || October 8, 2008 || Catalina || CSS || — || align=right | 1.0 km || 
|-id=749 bgcolor=#fefefe
| 438749 ||  || — || October 10, 2008 || Mount Lemmon || Mount Lemmon Survey || — || align=right | 1.0 km || 
|-id=750 bgcolor=#E9E9E9
| 438750 ||  || — || September 26, 2008 || Kitt Peak || Spacewatch || — || align=right | 1.4 km || 
|-id=751 bgcolor=#E9E9E9
| 438751 ||  || — || September 7, 2008 || Mount Lemmon || Mount Lemmon Survey || — || align=right | 1.4 km || 
|-id=752 bgcolor=#E9E9E9
| 438752 ||  || — || October 21, 2008 || Kitt Peak || Spacewatch || — || align=right | 1.0 km || 
|-id=753 bgcolor=#fefefe
| 438753 ||  || — || September 7, 2008 || Mount Lemmon || Mount Lemmon Survey || NYS || align=right data-sort-value="0.58" | 580 m || 
|-id=754 bgcolor=#fefefe
| 438754 ||  || — || October 21, 2008 || Kitt Peak || Spacewatch || NYS || align=right data-sort-value="0.66" | 660 m || 
|-id=755 bgcolor=#fefefe
| 438755 ||  || — || October 21, 2008 || Kitt Peak || Spacewatch || — || align=right data-sort-value="0.89" | 890 m || 
|-id=756 bgcolor=#fefefe
| 438756 ||  || — || October 21, 2008 || Kitt Peak || Spacewatch || — || align=right | 1.1 km || 
|-id=757 bgcolor=#fefefe
| 438757 ||  || — || September 27, 2008 || Mount Lemmon || Mount Lemmon Survey || V || align=right data-sort-value="0.72" | 720 m || 
|-id=758 bgcolor=#E9E9E9
| 438758 ||  || — || October 21, 2008 || Mount Lemmon || Mount Lemmon Survey || — || align=right | 2.0 km || 
|-id=759 bgcolor=#E9E9E9
| 438759 ||  || — || October 23, 2008 || Kitt Peak || Spacewatch || MAR || align=right | 1.0 km || 
|-id=760 bgcolor=#E9E9E9
| 438760 ||  || — || October 23, 2008 || Kitt Peak || Spacewatch || — || align=right data-sort-value="0.96" | 960 m || 
|-id=761 bgcolor=#fefefe
| 438761 ||  || — || September 7, 2008 || Mount Lemmon || Mount Lemmon Survey || — || align=right | 1.1 km || 
|-id=762 bgcolor=#fefefe
| 438762 ||  || — || October 24, 2008 || Mount Lemmon || Mount Lemmon Survey || NYS || align=right data-sort-value="0.68" | 680 m || 
|-id=763 bgcolor=#E9E9E9
| 438763 ||  || — || October 24, 2008 || Catalina || CSS || — || align=right | 2.3 km || 
|-id=764 bgcolor=#fefefe
| 438764 ||  || — || October 24, 2008 || Kitt Peak || Spacewatch || — || align=right data-sort-value="0.81" | 810 m || 
|-id=765 bgcolor=#E9E9E9
| 438765 ||  || — || October 24, 2008 || Kitt Peak || Spacewatch || — || align=right | 1.5 km || 
|-id=766 bgcolor=#E9E9E9
| 438766 ||  || — || October 25, 2008 || Kitt Peak || Spacewatch || MAR || align=right | 1.2 km || 
|-id=767 bgcolor=#E9E9E9
| 438767 ||  || — || October 25, 2008 || Kitt Peak || Spacewatch || — || align=right | 1.7 km || 
|-id=768 bgcolor=#fefefe
| 438768 ||  || — || August 4, 2008 || Siding Spring || SSS || — || align=right | 1.1 km || 
|-id=769 bgcolor=#E9E9E9
| 438769 ||  || — || October 30, 2008 || Catalina || CSS || — || align=right | 2.7 km || 
|-id=770 bgcolor=#E9E9E9
| 438770 ||  || — || September 9, 2008 || Mount Lemmon || Mount Lemmon Survey || — || align=right | 1.3 km || 
|-id=771 bgcolor=#fefefe
| 438771 ||  || — || October 29, 2008 || Kitt Peak || Spacewatch || — || align=right | 1.3 km || 
|-id=772 bgcolor=#fefefe
| 438772 ||  || — || October 25, 2008 || Mount Lemmon || Mount Lemmon Survey || — || align=right data-sort-value="0.91" | 910 m || 
|-id=773 bgcolor=#E9E9E9
| 438773 ||  || — || October 1, 2008 || Mount Lemmon || Mount Lemmon Survey || — || align=right | 1.6 km || 
|-id=774 bgcolor=#E9E9E9
| 438774 ||  || — || November 11, 2004 || Kitt Peak || Spacewatch || — || align=right | 1.8 km || 
|-id=775 bgcolor=#E9E9E9
| 438775 ||  || — || October 23, 2008 || Kitt Peak || Spacewatch || — || align=right | 1.6 km || 
|-id=776 bgcolor=#fefefe
| 438776 ||  || — || October 24, 2008 || Kitt Peak || Spacewatch || — || align=right | 1.3 km || 
|-id=777 bgcolor=#fefefe
| 438777 ||  || — || October 26, 2008 || Kitt Peak || Spacewatch || H || align=right data-sort-value="0.66" | 660 m || 
|-id=778 bgcolor=#E9E9E9
| 438778 ||  || — || October 25, 2008 || Socorro || LINEAR || — || align=right | 2.3 km || 
|-id=779 bgcolor=#E9E9E9
| 438779 ||  || — || November 2, 2008 || Mount Lemmon || Mount Lemmon Survey || — || align=right | 3.6 km || 
|-id=780 bgcolor=#fefefe
| 438780 ||  || — || November 2, 2008 || Vail-Jarnac || Jarnac Obs. || NYS || align=right data-sort-value="0.70" | 700 m || 
|-id=781 bgcolor=#fefefe
| 438781 ||  || — || November 4, 2008 || Kitt Peak || Spacewatch || MAS || align=right data-sort-value="0.80" | 800 m || 
|-id=782 bgcolor=#E9E9E9
| 438782 ||  || — || October 30, 2008 || Catalina || CSS || — || align=right | 1.6 km || 
|-id=783 bgcolor=#fefefe
| 438783 ||  || — || November 7, 2008 || Socorro || LINEAR || — || align=right | 3.4 km || 
|-id=784 bgcolor=#E9E9E9
| 438784 ||  || — || November 2, 2008 || Mount Lemmon || Mount Lemmon Survey || EUN || align=right | 1.4 km || 
|-id=785 bgcolor=#E9E9E9
| 438785 ||  || — || November 18, 2008 || Catalina || CSS || — || align=right | 1.2 km || 
|-id=786 bgcolor=#E9E9E9
| 438786 ||  || — || November 18, 2008 || Kitt Peak || Spacewatch || — || align=right | 1.6 km || 
|-id=787 bgcolor=#E9E9E9
| 438787 ||  || — || November 7, 2008 || Mount Lemmon || Mount Lemmon Survey || — || align=right | 1.3 km || 
|-id=788 bgcolor=#E9E9E9
| 438788 ||  || — || November 7, 2008 || Mount Lemmon || Mount Lemmon Survey || — || align=right data-sort-value="0.95" | 950 m || 
|-id=789 bgcolor=#E9E9E9
| 438789 ||  || — || November 24, 2008 || Mount Lemmon || Mount Lemmon Survey || — || align=right | 1.1 km || 
|-id=790 bgcolor=#E9E9E9
| 438790 ||  || — || November 30, 2008 || Socorro || LINEAR || — || align=right | 2.8 km || 
|-id=791 bgcolor=#fefefe
| 438791 ||  || — || December 1, 2008 || Skylive Obs. || F. Tozzi || H || align=right data-sort-value="0.89" | 890 m || 
|-id=792 bgcolor=#E9E9E9
| 438792 ||  || — || December 2, 2008 || Socorro || LINEAR || — || align=right | 1.3 km || 
|-id=793 bgcolor=#E9E9E9
| 438793 ||  || — || November 7, 2008 || Mount Lemmon || Mount Lemmon Survey || — || align=right | 1.4 km || 
|-id=794 bgcolor=#fefefe
| 438794 ||  || — || October 26, 2008 || Mount Lemmon || Mount Lemmon Survey || — || align=right data-sort-value="0.99" | 990 m || 
|-id=795 bgcolor=#E9E9E9
| 438795 ||  || — || December 1, 2008 || Kitt Peak || Spacewatch || DOR || align=right | 3.0 km || 
|-id=796 bgcolor=#E9E9E9
| 438796 ||  || — || October 27, 2008 || Kitt Peak || Spacewatch || — || align=right | 1.3 km || 
|-id=797 bgcolor=#E9E9E9
| 438797 ||  || — || December 21, 2008 || Mount Lemmon || Mount Lemmon Survey || — || align=right | 1.0 km || 
|-id=798 bgcolor=#E9E9E9
| 438798 ||  || — || December 29, 2008 || Calvin-Rehoboth || L. A. Molnar || — || align=right data-sort-value="0.92" | 920 m || 
|-id=799 bgcolor=#E9E9E9
| 438799 ||  || — || November 19, 2008 || Mount Lemmon || Mount Lemmon Survey || — || align=right | 2.0 km || 
|-id=800 bgcolor=#fefefe
| 438800 ||  || — || December 29, 2008 || Kitt Peak || Spacewatch || H || align=right data-sort-value="0.87" | 870 m || 
|}

438801–438900 

|-bgcolor=#E9E9E9
| 438801 ||  || — || December 29, 2008 || Mount Lemmon || Mount Lemmon Survey || AGN || align=right | 1.00 km || 
|-id=802 bgcolor=#d6d6d6
| 438802 ||  || — || December 29, 2008 || Mount Lemmon || Mount Lemmon Survey || — || align=right | 2.7 km || 
|-id=803 bgcolor=#fefefe
| 438803 ||  || — || December 1, 2008 || Mount Lemmon || Mount Lemmon Survey || H || align=right data-sort-value="0.71" | 710 m || 
|-id=804 bgcolor=#fefefe
| 438804 ||  || — || December 30, 2008 || Mount Lemmon || Mount Lemmon Survey || H || align=right data-sort-value="0.65" | 650 m || 
|-id=805 bgcolor=#E9E9E9
| 438805 ||  || — || December 31, 2008 || Kitt Peak || Spacewatch || EUN || align=right | 1.5 km || 
|-id=806 bgcolor=#E9E9E9
| 438806 ||  || — || November 20, 2008 || Mount Lemmon || Mount Lemmon Survey || — || align=right | 1.4 km || 
|-id=807 bgcolor=#E9E9E9
| 438807 ||  || — || December 29, 2008 || Kitt Peak || Spacewatch || HOF || align=right | 2.9 km || 
|-id=808 bgcolor=#E9E9E9
| 438808 ||  || — || December 29, 2008 || Kitt Peak || Spacewatch || — || align=right | 1.5 km || 
|-id=809 bgcolor=#d6d6d6
| 438809 ||  || — || December 29, 2008 || Kitt Peak || Spacewatch || — || align=right | 2.4 km || 
|-id=810 bgcolor=#E9E9E9
| 438810 ||  || — || December 29, 2008 || Kitt Peak || Spacewatch || DOR || align=right | 2.7 km || 
|-id=811 bgcolor=#E9E9E9
| 438811 ||  || — || December 22, 2008 || Kitt Peak || Spacewatch || — || align=right | 2.1 km || 
|-id=812 bgcolor=#E9E9E9
| 438812 ||  || — || November 6, 2008 || Mount Lemmon || Mount Lemmon Survey || — || align=right | 2.0 km || 
|-id=813 bgcolor=#E9E9E9
| 438813 ||  || — || December 30, 2008 || Kitt Peak || Spacewatch || — || align=right | 2.8 km || 
|-id=814 bgcolor=#E9E9E9
| 438814 ||  || — || December 21, 2008 || Mount Lemmon || Mount Lemmon Survey || — || align=right | 1.0 km || 
|-id=815 bgcolor=#E9E9E9
| 438815 ||  || — || December 31, 2008 || Kitt Peak || Spacewatch || — || align=right | 3.1 km || 
|-id=816 bgcolor=#fefefe
| 438816 ||  || — || December 31, 2008 || Kitt Peak || Spacewatch || H || align=right data-sort-value="0.52" | 520 m || 
|-id=817 bgcolor=#E9E9E9
| 438817 ||  || — || December 30, 2008 || Kitt Peak || Spacewatch || HOF || align=right | 2.2 km || 
|-id=818 bgcolor=#E9E9E9
| 438818 ||  || — || December 30, 2008 || Mount Lemmon || Mount Lemmon Survey || — || align=right | 2.4 km || 
|-id=819 bgcolor=#fefefe
| 438819 ||  || — || January 1, 2009 || Kitt Peak || Spacewatch || H || align=right data-sort-value="0.79" | 790 m || 
|-id=820 bgcolor=#fefefe
| 438820 ||  || — || October 6, 2008 || Mount Lemmon || Mount Lemmon Survey || — || align=right | 1.1 km || 
|-id=821 bgcolor=#E9E9E9
| 438821 ||  || — || September 12, 2007 || Mount Lemmon || Mount Lemmon Survey || AST || align=right | 1.6 km || 
|-id=822 bgcolor=#E9E9E9
| 438822 ||  || — || September 14, 2007 || Kitt Peak || Spacewatch || — || align=right | 1.7 km || 
|-id=823 bgcolor=#E9E9E9
| 438823 ||  || — || January 2, 2009 || Mount Lemmon || Mount Lemmon Survey || — || align=right | 1.9 km || 
|-id=824 bgcolor=#fefefe
| 438824 ||  || — || January 7, 2009 || Kitt Peak || Spacewatch || H || align=right data-sort-value="0.54" | 540 m || 
|-id=825 bgcolor=#fefefe
| 438825 ||  || — || December 22, 2008 || Mount Lemmon || Mount Lemmon Survey || H || align=right data-sort-value="0.59" | 590 m || 
|-id=826 bgcolor=#E9E9E9
| 438826 ||  || — || January 17, 2009 || Tzec Maun || F. Tozzi || — || align=right | 3.4 km || 
|-id=827 bgcolor=#fefefe
| 438827 ||  || — || January 18, 2009 || Catalina || CSS || H || align=right data-sort-value="0.72" | 720 m || 
|-id=828 bgcolor=#E9E9E9
| 438828 ||  || — || October 29, 2008 || Kitt Peak || Spacewatch || — || align=right | 3.0 km || 
|-id=829 bgcolor=#E9E9E9
| 438829 Visena ||  ||  || January 21, 2009 || Obs. de L' Ametlla || A. Garrigós-Sánchez ||  || align=right | 2.9 km || 
|-id=830 bgcolor=#d6d6d6
| 438830 ||  || — || December 21, 2008 || Mount Lemmon || Mount Lemmon Survey || — || align=right | 2.1 km || 
|-id=831 bgcolor=#E9E9E9
| 438831 ||  || — || January 16, 2009 || Kitt Peak || Spacewatch || GEF || align=right | 1.2 km || 
|-id=832 bgcolor=#E9E9E9
| 438832 ||  || — || January 16, 2009 || Kitt Peak || Spacewatch || — || align=right | 1.6 km || 
|-id=833 bgcolor=#E9E9E9
| 438833 ||  || — || November 6, 2008 || Mount Lemmon || Mount Lemmon Survey || — || align=right | 1.1 km || 
|-id=834 bgcolor=#E9E9E9
| 438834 ||  || — || January 25, 2009 || Socorro || LINEAR || — || align=right | 1.2 km || 
|-id=835 bgcolor=#E9E9E9
| 438835 ||  || — || January 31, 2009 || Kitt Peak || Spacewatch || — || align=right | 1.2 km || 
|-id=836 bgcolor=#d6d6d6
| 438836 ||  || — || January 25, 2009 || Kitt Peak || Spacewatch || — || align=right | 2.0 km || 
|-id=837 bgcolor=#d6d6d6
| 438837 ||  || — || November 2, 2007 || Mount Lemmon || Mount Lemmon Survey || — || align=right | 2.3 km || 
|-id=838 bgcolor=#E9E9E9
| 438838 ||  || — || January 30, 2009 || Mount Lemmon || Mount Lemmon Survey || NEM || align=right | 2.2 km || 
|-id=839 bgcolor=#d6d6d6
| 438839 ||  || — || September 14, 2007 || Mount Lemmon || Mount Lemmon Survey || KOR || align=right | 1.4 km || 
|-id=840 bgcolor=#E9E9E9
| 438840 ||  || — || January 31, 2009 || Kitt Peak || Spacewatch || — || align=right | 2.0 km || 
|-id=841 bgcolor=#fefefe
| 438841 ||  || — || January 30, 2009 || Kitt Peak || Spacewatch || H || align=right data-sort-value="0.82" | 820 m || 
|-id=842 bgcolor=#E9E9E9
| 438842 ||  || — || October 19, 2007 || Catalina || CSS || — || align=right | 1.6 km || 
|-id=843 bgcolor=#fefefe
| 438843 ||  || — || January 16, 2009 || Kitt Peak || Spacewatch || H || align=right data-sort-value="0.83" | 830 m || 
|-id=844 bgcolor=#E9E9E9
| 438844 ||  || — || February 1, 2009 || Mount Lemmon || Mount Lemmon Survey ||  || align=right | 2.8 km || 
|-id=845 bgcolor=#E9E9E9
| 438845 ||  || — || December 31, 2008 || Mount Lemmon || Mount Lemmon Survey || — || align=right | 1.4 km || 
|-id=846 bgcolor=#d6d6d6
| 438846 ||  || — || February 1, 2009 || Kitt Peak || Spacewatch || — || align=right | 2.2 km || 
|-id=847 bgcolor=#E9E9E9
| 438847 ||  || — || February 1, 2009 || Kitt Peak || Spacewatch || — || align=right | 2.2 km || 
|-id=848 bgcolor=#E9E9E9
| 438848 ||  || — || February 2, 2009 || Catalina || CSS || — || align=right | 3.1 km || 
|-id=849 bgcolor=#d6d6d6
| 438849 ||  || — || February 14, 2009 || Mount Lemmon || Mount Lemmon Survey || — || align=right | 2.1 km || 
|-id=850 bgcolor=#E9E9E9
| 438850 ||  || — || February 14, 2009 || Mount Lemmon || Mount Lemmon Survey || — || align=right | 2.7 km || 
|-id=851 bgcolor=#d6d6d6
| 438851 ||  || — || July 30, 2005 || Siding Spring || SSS || — || align=right | 3.9 km || 
|-id=852 bgcolor=#E9E9E9
| 438852 ||  || — || May 25, 2006 || Kitt Peak || Spacewatch || — || align=right | 2.3 km || 
|-id=853 bgcolor=#d6d6d6
| 438853 ||  || — || February 22, 2009 || Mount Lemmon || Mount Lemmon Survey || — || align=right | 3.2 km || 
|-id=854 bgcolor=#d6d6d6
| 438854 ||  || — || February 22, 2009 || Kitt Peak || Spacewatch || — || align=right | 2.4 km || 
|-id=855 bgcolor=#d6d6d6
| 438855 ||  || — || October 2, 2006 || Mount Lemmon || Mount Lemmon Survey || — || align=right | 2.2 km || 
|-id=856 bgcolor=#E9E9E9
| 438856 ||  || — || February 20, 2009 || Kitt Peak || Spacewatch || — || align=right | 2.1 km || 
|-id=857 bgcolor=#d6d6d6
| 438857 ||  || — || February 27, 2009 || Kitt Peak || Spacewatch || — || align=right | 2.2 km || 
|-id=858 bgcolor=#d6d6d6
| 438858 ||  || — || February 26, 2009 || Catalina || CSS || — || align=right | 3.5 km || 
|-id=859 bgcolor=#d6d6d6
| 438859 ||  || — || February 20, 2009 || Catalina || CSS || — || align=right | 2.4 km || 
|-id=860 bgcolor=#d6d6d6
| 438860 ||  || — || February 26, 2009 || Kitt Peak || Spacewatch || — || align=right | 2.1 km || 
|-id=861 bgcolor=#d6d6d6
| 438861 ||  || — || March 15, 2009 || Kitt Peak || Spacewatch || — || align=right | 2.0 km || 
|-id=862 bgcolor=#d6d6d6
| 438862 ||  || — || February 19, 2009 || Kitt Peak || Spacewatch || — || align=right | 2.2 km || 
|-id=863 bgcolor=#d6d6d6
| 438863 ||  || — || March 26, 2009 || Mount Lemmon || Mount Lemmon Survey || — || align=right | 2.9 km || 
|-id=864 bgcolor=#d6d6d6
| 438864 ||  || — || March 29, 2009 || Kitt Peak || Spacewatch || — || align=right | 3.6 km || 
|-id=865 bgcolor=#d6d6d6
| 438865 ||  || — || March 26, 2009 || Kitt Peak || Spacewatch || — || align=right | 2.4 km || 
|-id=866 bgcolor=#d6d6d6
| 438866 ||  || — || March 31, 2009 || Kitt Peak || Spacewatch || — || align=right | 3.0 km || 
|-id=867 bgcolor=#fefefe
| 438867 ||  || — || March 29, 2009 || Socorro || LINEAR || — || align=right data-sort-value="0.70" | 700 m || 
|-id=868 bgcolor=#d6d6d6
| 438868 ||  || — || April 17, 2009 || Kitt Peak || Spacewatch || VER || align=right | 3.0 km || 
|-id=869 bgcolor=#d6d6d6
| 438869 ||  || — || April 20, 2009 || Mount Lemmon || Mount Lemmon Survey || VER || align=right | 2.7 km || 
|-id=870 bgcolor=#d6d6d6
| 438870 ||  || — || April 19, 2009 || Kitt Peak || Spacewatch || — || align=right | 2.6 km || 
|-id=871 bgcolor=#d6d6d6
| 438871 ||  || — || April 19, 2009 || Mount Lemmon || Mount Lemmon Survey || — || align=right | 3.2 km || 
|-id=872 bgcolor=#d6d6d6
| 438872 ||  || — || March 26, 2009 || Kitt Peak || Spacewatch || — || align=right | 2.9 km || 
|-id=873 bgcolor=#d6d6d6
| 438873 ||  || — || April 22, 2009 || Mount Lemmon || Mount Lemmon Survey || — || align=right | 2.7 km || 
|-id=874 bgcolor=#d6d6d6
| 438874 ||  || — || April 25, 2009 || Črni Vrh || Črni Vrh || Tj (2.99) || align=right | 3.1 km || 
|-id=875 bgcolor=#d6d6d6
| 438875 ||  || — || April 30, 2009 || Kitt Peak || Spacewatch || — || align=right | 2.4 km || 
|-id=876 bgcolor=#d6d6d6
| 438876 ||  || — || April 23, 2009 || Kitt Peak || Spacewatch ||  || align=right | 3.3 km || 
|-id=877 bgcolor=#d6d6d6
| 438877 ||  || — || April 23, 2009 || Kitt Peak || Spacewatch || — || align=right | 2.9 km || 
|-id=878 bgcolor=#d6d6d6
| 438878 ||  || — || April 19, 2009 || Kitt Peak || Spacewatch || — || align=right | 3.3 km || 
|-id=879 bgcolor=#fefefe
| 438879 ||  || — || September 12, 2009 || Kitt Peak || Spacewatch || — || align=right data-sort-value="0.67" | 670 m || 
|-id=880 bgcolor=#fefefe
| 438880 ||  || — || September 12, 2009 || Kitt Peak || Spacewatch || — || align=right data-sort-value="0.57" | 570 m || 
|-id=881 bgcolor=#fefefe
| 438881 ||  || — || September 10, 2009 || ESA OGS || ESA OGS || — || align=right data-sort-value="0.87" | 870 m || 
|-id=882 bgcolor=#fefefe
| 438882 ||  || — || March 17, 2005 || Mount Lemmon || Mount Lemmon Survey || — || align=right data-sort-value="0.71" | 710 m || 
|-id=883 bgcolor=#fefefe
| 438883 ||  || — || September 17, 2009 || Kitt Peak || Spacewatch || — || align=right data-sort-value="0.70" | 700 m || 
|-id=884 bgcolor=#fefefe
| 438884 ||  || — || September 17, 2009 || Catalina || CSS || — || align=right data-sort-value="0.75" | 750 m || 
|-id=885 bgcolor=#fefefe
| 438885 ||  || — || September 20, 2009 || Kitt Peak || Spacewatch || — || align=right data-sort-value="0.70" | 700 m || 
|-id=886 bgcolor=#fefefe
| 438886 ||  || — || September 21, 2009 || Kitt Peak || Spacewatch || — || align=right data-sort-value="0.94" | 940 m || 
|-id=887 bgcolor=#fefefe
| 438887 ||  || — || September 21, 2009 || Kitt Peak || Spacewatch || V || align=right data-sort-value="0.67" | 670 m || 
|-id=888 bgcolor=#fefefe
| 438888 ||  || — || September 23, 2009 || Kitt Peak || Spacewatch || — || align=right data-sort-value="0.75" | 750 m || 
|-id=889 bgcolor=#FA8072
| 438889 ||  || — || September 18, 2009 || Kitt Peak || Spacewatch || — || align=right data-sort-value="0.52" | 520 m || 
|-id=890 bgcolor=#fefefe
| 438890 ||  || — || September 22, 2009 || Kitt Peak || Spacewatch || V || align=right data-sort-value="0.64" | 640 m || 
|-id=891 bgcolor=#d6d6d6
| 438891 ||  || — || October 14, 2009 || La Sagra || OAM Obs. || 7:4 || align=right | 4.8 km || 
|-id=892 bgcolor=#fefefe
| 438892 ||  || — || September 25, 2009 || Kitt Peak || Spacewatch || — || align=right data-sort-value="0.71" | 710 m || 
|-id=893 bgcolor=#fefefe
| 438893 ||  || — || October 18, 2009 || Mount Lemmon || Mount Lemmon Survey || — || align=right data-sort-value="0.71" | 710 m || 
|-id=894 bgcolor=#fefefe
| 438894 ||  || — || October 23, 2009 || Mount Lemmon || Mount Lemmon Survey || — || align=right data-sort-value="0.58" | 580 m || 
|-id=895 bgcolor=#fefefe
| 438895 ||  || — || October 24, 2009 || Catalina || CSS || — || align=right data-sort-value="0.75" | 750 m || 
|-id=896 bgcolor=#fefefe
| 438896 ||  || — || May 10, 2008 || Catalina || CSS || — || align=right | 1.6 km || 
|-id=897 bgcolor=#FFC2E0
| 438897 ||  || — || November 16, 2009 || Catalina || CSS || AMO || align=right data-sort-value="0.95" | 950 m || 
|-id=898 bgcolor=#fefefe
| 438898 ||  || — || November 16, 2009 || Kitt Peak || Spacewatch || — || align=right | 1.2 km || 
|-id=899 bgcolor=#fefefe
| 438899 ||  || — || November 16, 2009 || Kitt Peak || Spacewatch || — || align=right data-sort-value="0.62" | 620 m || 
|-id=900 bgcolor=#fefefe
| 438900 ||  || — || November 18, 2009 || Kitt Peak || Spacewatch || — || align=right | 2.7 km || 
|}

438901–439000 

|-bgcolor=#E9E9E9
| 438901 ||  || — || October 25, 2005 || Kitt Peak || Spacewatch || — || align=right data-sort-value="0.81" | 810 m || 
|-id=902 bgcolor=#FFC2E0
| 438902 ||  || — || November 23, 2009 || Mount Lemmon || Mount Lemmon Survey || AMO +1km || align=right | 2.2 km || 
|-id=903 bgcolor=#fefefe
| 438903 ||  || — || November 20, 2009 || Kitt Peak || Spacewatch || — || align=right data-sort-value="0.90" | 900 m || 
|-id=904 bgcolor=#fefefe
| 438904 ||  || — || November 17, 2009 || Kitt Peak || Spacewatch || — || align=right data-sort-value="0.90" | 900 m || 
|-id=905 bgcolor=#fefefe
| 438905 ||  || — || November 18, 2009 || Kitt Peak || Spacewatch || — || align=right data-sort-value="0.94" | 940 m || 
|-id=906 bgcolor=#fefefe
| 438906 ||  || — || November 9, 2009 || Kitt Peak || Spacewatch || — || align=right | 1.0 km || 
|-id=907 bgcolor=#fefefe
| 438907 ||  || — || November 24, 2009 || Kitt Peak || Spacewatch || — || align=right | 1.0 km || 
|-id=908 bgcolor=#FFC2E0
| 438908 ||  || — || December 9, 2009 || La Sagra || OAM Obs. || APOPHA || align=right data-sort-value="0.26" | 260 m || 
|-id=909 bgcolor=#fefefe
| 438909 ||  || — || December 15, 2009 || Mount Lemmon || Mount Lemmon Survey || V || align=right data-sort-value="0.74" | 740 m || 
|-id=910 bgcolor=#fefefe
| 438910 ||  || — || December 15, 2009 || Mount Lemmon || Mount Lemmon Survey || — || align=right data-sort-value="0.86" | 860 m || 
|-id=911 bgcolor=#E9E9E9
| 438911 ||  || — || December 17, 2009 || Mount Lemmon || Mount Lemmon Survey || — || align=right | 1.4 km || 
|-id=912 bgcolor=#fefefe
| 438912 ||  || — || December 18, 2009 || Mount Lemmon || Mount Lemmon Survey || — || align=right | 1.9 km || 
|-id=913 bgcolor=#E9E9E9
| 438913 ||  || — || January 8, 2010 || Catalina || CSS || — || align=right | 1.6 km || 
|-id=914 bgcolor=#E9E9E9
| 438914 ||  || — || January 21, 2010 || WISE || WISE || — || align=right | 2.5 km || 
|-id=915 bgcolor=#E9E9E9
| 438915 ||  || — || January 8, 2010 || Mount Lemmon || Mount Lemmon Survey || — || align=right | 1.5 km || 
|-id=916 bgcolor=#E9E9E9
| 438916 ||  || — || February 10, 2010 || WISE || WISE || — || align=right | 3.8 km || 
|-id=917 bgcolor=#d6d6d6
| 438917 ||  || — || December 5, 2007 || Kitt Peak || Spacewatch || — || align=right | 3.7 km || 
|-id=918 bgcolor=#E9E9E9
| 438918 ||  || — || February 9, 2010 || Kitt Peak || Spacewatch || MAR || align=right | 1.1 km || 
|-id=919 bgcolor=#E9E9E9
| 438919 ||  || — || January 8, 2010 || Mount Lemmon || Mount Lemmon Survey || — || align=right | 2.0 km || 
|-id=920 bgcolor=#fefefe
| 438920 ||  || — || February 9, 2010 || Catalina || CSS || — || align=right | 2.3 km || 
|-id=921 bgcolor=#E9E9E9
| 438921 ||  || — || February 14, 2010 || Socorro || LINEAR || — || align=right | 2.9 km || 
|-id=922 bgcolor=#E9E9E9
| 438922 ||  || — || February 13, 2010 || Mount Lemmon || Mount Lemmon Survey || — || align=right | 1.2 km || 
|-id=923 bgcolor=#E9E9E9
| 438923 ||  || — || February 14, 2010 || Kitt Peak || Spacewatch || — || align=right | 1.6 km || 
|-id=924 bgcolor=#E9E9E9
| 438924 ||  || — || February 14, 2010 || Mount Lemmon || Mount Lemmon Survey || — || align=right | 1.5 km || 
|-id=925 bgcolor=#E9E9E9
| 438925 ||  || — || January 31, 2006 || Kitt Peak || Spacewatch || — || align=right | 1.1 km || 
|-id=926 bgcolor=#E9E9E9
| 438926 ||  || — || February 14, 2010 || Kitt Peak || Spacewatch || MAR || align=right | 1.2 km || 
|-id=927 bgcolor=#E9E9E9
| 438927 ||  || — || February 13, 2010 || Kitt Peak || Spacewatch || — || align=right | 1.5 km || 
|-id=928 bgcolor=#E9E9E9
| 438928 ||  || — || February 17, 2010 || Kitt Peak || Spacewatch || — || align=right | 2.5 km || 
|-id=929 bgcolor=#E9E9E9
| 438929 ||  || — || April 14, 2001 || Kitt Peak || Spacewatch || — || align=right | 2.0 km || 
|-id=930 bgcolor=#E9E9E9
| 438930 ||  || — || March 13, 2010 || Dauban || F. Kugel || DOR || align=right | 2.1 km || 
|-id=931 bgcolor=#E9E9E9
| 438931 ||  || — || January 10, 2010 || WISE || WISE || DOR || align=right | 2.9 km || 
|-id=932 bgcolor=#E9E9E9
| 438932 ||  || — || February 18, 2010 || Mount Lemmon || Mount Lemmon Survey || — || align=right | 1.7 km || 
|-id=933 bgcolor=#E9E9E9
| 438933 ||  || — || October 1, 2008 || Kitt Peak || Spacewatch || — || align=right | 1.5 km || 
|-id=934 bgcolor=#E9E9E9
| 438934 ||  || — || October 13, 2007 || Mount Lemmon || Mount Lemmon Survey || — || align=right | 3.0 km || 
|-id=935 bgcolor=#E9E9E9
| 438935 ||  || — || April 5, 2010 || Mount Lemmon || Mount Lemmon Survey || — || align=right | 1.7 km || 
|-id=936 bgcolor=#E9E9E9
| 438936 ||  || — || April 5, 2010 || Kitt Peak || Spacewatch || — || align=right | 2.3 km || 
|-id=937 bgcolor=#E9E9E9
| 438937 ||  || — || April 15, 2010 || WISE || WISE || JUN || align=right | 1.6 km || 
|-id=938 bgcolor=#fefefe
| 438938 ||  || — || April 8, 2010 || Kitt Peak || Spacewatch || H || align=right data-sort-value="0.83" | 830 m || 
|-id=939 bgcolor=#d6d6d6
| 438939 ||  || — || April 14, 2010 || Mount Lemmon || Mount Lemmon Survey || BRA || align=right | 1.7 km || 
|-id=940 bgcolor=#d6d6d6
| 438940 ||  || — || April 24, 2010 || WISE || WISE || — || align=right | 4.9 km || 
|-id=941 bgcolor=#d6d6d6
| 438941 ||  || — || April 25, 2010 || WISE || WISE || URS || align=right | 4.4 km || 
|-id=942 bgcolor=#E9E9E9
| 438942 ||  || — || March 19, 2010 || Kitt Peak || Spacewatch || — || align=right | 1.5 km || 
|-id=943 bgcolor=#E9E9E9
| 438943 ||  || — || April 15, 2010 || Kitt Peak || Spacewatch || — || align=right | 2.2 km || 
|-id=944 bgcolor=#E9E9E9
| 438944 ||  || — || May 6, 2010 || Kitt Peak || Spacewatch || GEF || align=right | 1.1 km || 
|-id=945 bgcolor=#E9E9E9
| 438945 ||  || — || April 14, 2010 || Mount Lemmon || Mount Lemmon Survey || — || align=right | 2.5 km || 
|-id=946 bgcolor=#d6d6d6
| 438946 ||  || — || May 14, 2010 || WISE || WISE || — || align=right | 3.1 km || 
|-id=947 bgcolor=#E9E9E9
| 438947 ||  || — || April 9, 2010 || Kitt Peak || Spacewatch || AEO || align=right | 1.1 km || 
|-id=948 bgcolor=#E9E9E9
| 438948 ||  || — || May 5, 2010 || Mount Lemmon || Mount Lemmon Survey || — || align=right | 2.5 km || 
|-id=949 bgcolor=#fefefe
| 438949 ||  || — || November 26, 2003 || Kitt Peak || Spacewatch || H || align=right data-sort-value="0.89" | 890 m || 
|-id=950 bgcolor=#E9E9E9
| 438950 ||  || — || April 7, 2010 || Mount Lemmon || Mount Lemmon Survey || — || align=right | 2.0 km || 
|-id=951 bgcolor=#E9E9E9
| 438951 ||  || — || October 16, 2007 || Mount Lemmon || Mount Lemmon Survey || — || align=right | 1.3 km || 
|-id=952 bgcolor=#d6d6d6
| 438952 ||  || — || May 29, 2010 || WISE || WISE || — || align=right | 2.4 km || 
|-id=953 bgcolor=#fefefe
| 438953 ||  || — || May 19, 2010 || Catalina || CSS || H || align=right data-sort-value="0.88" | 880 m || 
|-id=954 bgcolor=#d6d6d6
| 438954 ||  || — || June 2, 2010 || WISE || WISE || — || align=right | 3.6 km || 
|-id=955 bgcolor=#FFC2E0
| 438955 ||  || — || June 6, 2010 || Nogales || Tenagra II Obs. || APOPHA || align=right data-sort-value="0.22" | 220 m || 
|-id=956 bgcolor=#d6d6d6
| 438956 ||  || — || June 3, 2010 || WISE || WISE || — || align=right | 3.0 km || 
|-id=957 bgcolor=#d6d6d6
| 438957 ||  || — || June 10, 2010 || WISE || WISE || — || align=right | 2.5 km || 
|-id=958 bgcolor=#d6d6d6
| 438958 ||  || — || October 29, 2005 || Catalina || CSS || — || align=right | 4.5 km || 
|-id=959 bgcolor=#d6d6d6
| 438959 ||  || — || June 11, 2010 || WISE || WISE || — || align=right | 5.8 km || 
|-id=960 bgcolor=#d6d6d6
| 438960 ||  || — || June 11, 2010 || WISE || WISE || — || align=right | 3.5 km || 
|-id=961 bgcolor=#d6d6d6
| 438961 ||  || — || October 1, 2005 || Catalina || CSS || — || align=right | 3.5 km || 
|-id=962 bgcolor=#d6d6d6
| 438962 ||  || — || June 13, 2010 || WISE || WISE || — || align=right | 2.8 km || 
|-id=963 bgcolor=#d6d6d6
| 438963 ||  || — || June 13, 2010 || WISE || WISE || — || align=right | 2.3 km || 
|-id=964 bgcolor=#d6d6d6
| 438964 ||  || — || June 19, 2010 || Catalina || CSS || — || align=right | 5.7 km || 
|-id=965 bgcolor=#d6d6d6
| 438965 ||  || — || October 25, 2005 || Catalina || CSS || — || align=right | 4.2 km || 
|-id=966 bgcolor=#d6d6d6
| 438966 ||  || — || November 16, 2006 || Kitt Peak || Spacewatch || — || align=right | 4.4 km || 
|-id=967 bgcolor=#d6d6d6
| 438967 ||  || — || June 17, 2010 || WISE || WISE || — || align=right | 2.7 km || 
|-id=968 bgcolor=#d6d6d6
| 438968 ||  || — || June 24, 2010 || WISE || WISE || Tj (2.99) || align=right | 5.8 km || 
|-id=969 bgcolor=#d6d6d6
| 438969 ||  || — || June 25, 2010 || WISE || WISE || 7:4 || align=right | 5.2 km || 
|-id=970 bgcolor=#d6d6d6
| 438970 ||  || — || December 5, 2005 || Kitt Peak || Spacewatch || — || align=right | 4.6 km || 
|-id=971 bgcolor=#d6d6d6
| 438971 ||  || — || June 28, 2010 || WISE || WISE || — || align=right | 2.8 km || 
|-id=972 bgcolor=#d6d6d6
| 438972 ||  || — || June 29, 2010 || WISE || WISE || — || align=right | 2.8 km || 
|-id=973 bgcolor=#d6d6d6
| 438973 Masci ||  ||  || July 2, 2010 || WISE || WISE || — || align=right | 3.1 km || 
|-id=974 bgcolor=#d6d6d6
| 438974 ||  || — || May 16, 2009 || Kitt Peak || Spacewatch || — || align=right | 2.1 km || 
|-id=975 bgcolor=#d6d6d6
| 438975 ||  || — || July 10, 2010 || WISE || WISE || — || align=right | 4.4 km || 
|-id=976 bgcolor=#d6d6d6
| 438976 ||  || — || July 10, 2010 || WISE || WISE || — || align=right | 2.1 km || 
|-id=977 bgcolor=#d6d6d6
| 438977 ||  || — || April 5, 2008 || Mount Lemmon || Mount Lemmon Survey || — || align=right | 2.7 km || 
|-id=978 bgcolor=#d6d6d6
| 438978 ||  || — || November 25, 2005 || Kitt Peak || Spacewatch || — || align=right | 2.7 km || 
|-id=979 bgcolor=#d6d6d6
| 438979 ||  || — || July 23, 2010 || WISE || WISE || — || align=right | 4.0 km || 
|-id=980 bgcolor=#d6d6d6
| 438980 ||  || — || June 17, 2010 || Mount Lemmon || Mount Lemmon Survey || — || align=right | 4.2 km || 
|-id=981 bgcolor=#d6d6d6
| 438981 ||  || — || October 30, 2005 || Mount Lemmon || Mount Lemmon Survey || — || align=right | 1.3 km || 
|-id=982 bgcolor=#d6d6d6
| 438982 ||  || — || December 3, 2005 || Kitt Peak || Spacewatch || — || align=right | 4.5 km || 
|-id=983 bgcolor=#d6d6d6
| 438983 ||  || — || August 8, 2010 || WISE || WISE || — || align=right | 4.5 km || 
|-id=984 bgcolor=#d6d6d6
| 438984 ||  || — || November 17, 2006 || Kitt Peak || Spacewatch || EOS || align=right | 2.1 km || 
|-id=985 bgcolor=#d6d6d6
| 438985 ||  || — || December 5, 1999 || Kitt Peak || Spacewatch || — || align=right | 2.9 km || 
|-id=986 bgcolor=#d6d6d6
| 438986 ||  || — || September 3, 2010 || Mount Lemmon || Mount Lemmon Survey || — || align=right | 2.6 km || 
|-id=987 bgcolor=#d6d6d6
| 438987 ||  || — || September 3, 2010 || Mount Lemmon || Mount Lemmon Survey || — || align=right | 2.8 km || 
|-id=988 bgcolor=#d6d6d6
| 438988 ||  || — || September 2, 2010 || Mount Lemmon || Mount Lemmon Survey || — || align=right | 2.4 km || 
|-id=989 bgcolor=#d6d6d6
| 438989 ||  || — || April 13, 2004 || Kitt Peak || Spacewatch || — || align=right | 2.2 km || 
|-id=990 bgcolor=#FFC2E0
| 438990 ||  || — || September 27, 2010 || Kitt Peak || Spacewatch || APOcritical || align=right data-sort-value="0.82" | 820 m || 
|-id=991 bgcolor=#d6d6d6
| 438991 ||  || — || January 28, 2007 || Mount Lemmon || Mount Lemmon Survey || — || align=right | 3.2 km || 
|-id=992 bgcolor=#d6d6d6
| 438992 ||  || — || June 14, 2010 || Mount Lemmon || Mount Lemmon Survey || TIR || align=right | 3.0 km || 
|-id=993 bgcolor=#d6d6d6
| 438993 ||  || — || October 27, 2005 || Anderson Mesa || LONEOS || — || align=right | 2.6 km || 
|-id=994 bgcolor=#d6d6d6
| 438994 ||  || — || March 2, 2008 || Kitt Peak || Spacewatch || — || align=right | 2.6 km || 
|-id=995 bgcolor=#d6d6d6
| 438995 ||  || — || August 22, 2004 || Kitt Peak || Spacewatch || — || align=right | 3.6 km || 
|-id=996 bgcolor=#d6d6d6
| 438996 ||  || — || February 27, 2008 || Kitt Peak || Spacewatch || — || align=right | 3.3 km || 
|-id=997 bgcolor=#d6d6d6
| 438997 ||  || — || November 4, 2005 || Kitt Peak || Spacewatch || — || align=right | 3.0 km || 
|-id=998 bgcolor=#fefefe
| 438998 ||  || — || October 8, 2010 || Catalina || CSS || H || align=right data-sort-value="0.91" | 910 m || 
|-id=999 bgcolor=#d6d6d6
| 438999 ||  || — || October 30, 2010 || Mount Lemmon || Mount Lemmon Survey || TIR || align=right | 3.1 km || 
|-id=000 bgcolor=#d6d6d6
| 439000 ||  || — || August 12, 2010 || Kitt Peak || Spacewatch || — || align=right | 2.7 km || 
|}

References

External links 
 Discovery Circumstances: Numbered Minor Planets (435001)–(440000) (IAU Minor Planet Center)

0438